

126001–126100 

|-bgcolor=#E9E9E9
| 126001 ||  || — || December 18, 2001 || Socorro || LINEAR || — || align=right | 4.8 km || 
|-id=002 bgcolor=#fefefe
| 126002 ||  || — || December 18, 2001 || Socorro || LINEAR || V || align=right | 1.3 km || 
|-id=003 bgcolor=#E9E9E9
| 126003 ||  || — || December 18, 2001 || Socorro || LINEAR || — || align=right | 1.6 km || 
|-id=004 bgcolor=#fefefe
| 126004 ||  || — || December 18, 2001 || Socorro || LINEAR || NYS || align=right | 1.5 km || 
|-id=005 bgcolor=#fefefe
| 126005 ||  || — || December 18, 2001 || Socorro || LINEAR || NYS || align=right | 1.7 km || 
|-id=006 bgcolor=#fefefe
| 126006 ||  || — || December 18, 2001 || Socorro || LINEAR || NYS || align=right | 1.7 km || 
|-id=007 bgcolor=#fefefe
| 126007 ||  || — || December 18, 2001 || Socorro || LINEAR || NYS || align=right | 1.6 km || 
|-id=008 bgcolor=#E9E9E9
| 126008 ||  || — || December 18, 2001 || Socorro || LINEAR || — || align=right | 1.9 km || 
|-id=009 bgcolor=#E9E9E9
| 126009 ||  || — || December 18, 2001 || Socorro || LINEAR || — || align=right | 1.9 km || 
|-id=010 bgcolor=#E9E9E9
| 126010 ||  || — || December 18, 2001 || Socorro || LINEAR || — || align=right | 2.2 km || 
|-id=011 bgcolor=#fefefe
| 126011 ||  || — || December 18, 2001 || Socorro || LINEAR || — || align=right | 1.3 km || 
|-id=012 bgcolor=#fefefe
| 126012 ||  || — || December 18, 2001 || Socorro || LINEAR || — || align=right | 1.9 km || 
|-id=013 bgcolor=#fefefe
| 126013 ||  || — || December 18, 2001 || Socorro || LINEAR || — || align=right | 1.5 km || 
|-id=014 bgcolor=#fefefe
| 126014 ||  || — || December 18, 2001 || Socorro || LINEAR || NYS || align=right | 1.3 km || 
|-id=015 bgcolor=#E9E9E9
| 126015 ||  || — || December 18, 2001 || Socorro || LINEAR || — || align=right | 1.9 km || 
|-id=016 bgcolor=#fefefe
| 126016 ||  || — || December 18, 2001 || Socorro || LINEAR || FLO || align=right | 1.2 km || 
|-id=017 bgcolor=#fefefe
| 126017 ||  || — || December 18, 2001 || Socorro || LINEAR || NYS || align=right | 3.3 km || 
|-id=018 bgcolor=#E9E9E9
| 126018 ||  || — || December 18, 2001 || Socorro || LINEAR || MAR || align=right | 2.6 km || 
|-id=019 bgcolor=#E9E9E9
| 126019 ||  || — || December 18, 2001 || Socorro || LINEAR || — || align=right | 2.3 km || 
|-id=020 bgcolor=#fefefe
| 126020 ||  || — || December 18, 2001 || Socorro || LINEAR || NYS || align=right | 1.4 km || 
|-id=021 bgcolor=#fefefe
| 126021 ||  || — || December 18, 2001 || Socorro || LINEAR || NYS || align=right | 1.4 km || 
|-id=022 bgcolor=#fefefe
| 126022 ||  || — || December 18, 2001 || Socorro || LINEAR || — || align=right | 1.7 km || 
|-id=023 bgcolor=#E9E9E9
| 126023 ||  || — || December 18, 2001 || Socorro || LINEAR || — || align=right | 1.9 km || 
|-id=024 bgcolor=#fefefe
| 126024 ||  || — || December 18, 2001 || Socorro || LINEAR || — || align=right | 1.7 km || 
|-id=025 bgcolor=#E9E9E9
| 126025 ||  || — || December 18, 2001 || Socorro || LINEAR || — || align=right | 2.5 km || 
|-id=026 bgcolor=#fefefe
| 126026 ||  || — || December 18, 2001 || Socorro || LINEAR || NYS || align=right | 1.5 km || 
|-id=027 bgcolor=#fefefe
| 126027 ||  || — || December 18, 2001 || Socorro || LINEAR || — || align=right | 3.2 km || 
|-id=028 bgcolor=#fefefe
| 126028 ||  || — || December 18, 2001 || Socorro || LINEAR || — || align=right | 1.2 km || 
|-id=029 bgcolor=#fefefe
| 126029 ||  || — || December 18, 2001 || Socorro || LINEAR || NYS || align=right | 1.3 km || 
|-id=030 bgcolor=#fefefe
| 126030 ||  || — || December 18, 2001 || Socorro || LINEAR || V || align=right | 1.5 km || 
|-id=031 bgcolor=#E9E9E9
| 126031 ||  || — || December 18, 2001 || Socorro || LINEAR || — || align=right | 2.0 km || 
|-id=032 bgcolor=#fefefe
| 126032 ||  || — || December 18, 2001 || Socorro || LINEAR || NYS || align=right | 1.5 km || 
|-id=033 bgcolor=#fefefe
| 126033 ||  || — || December 18, 2001 || Socorro || LINEAR || — || align=right | 2.3 km || 
|-id=034 bgcolor=#fefefe
| 126034 ||  || — || December 18, 2001 || Socorro || LINEAR || NYS || align=right | 1.2 km || 
|-id=035 bgcolor=#E9E9E9
| 126035 ||  || — || December 18, 2001 || Socorro || LINEAR || — || align=right | 3.1 km || 
|-id=036 bgcolor=#fefefe
| 126036 ||  || — || December 18, 2001 || Socorro || LINEAR || — || align=right | 1.5 km || 
|-id=037 bgcolor=#E9E9E9
| 126037 ||  || — || December 18, 2001 || Socorro || LINEAR || — || align=right | 4.1 km || 
|-id=038 bgcolor=#fefefe
| 126038 ||  || — || December 18, 2001 || Socorro || LINEAR || MAS || align=right | 1.3 km || 
|-id=039 bgcolor=#fefefe
| 126039 ||  || — || December 18, 2001 || Socorro || LINEAR || — || align=right | 1.5 km || 
|-id=040 bgcolor=#fefefe
| 126040 ||  || — || December 18, 2001 || Socorro || LINEAR || — || align=right | 1.8 km || 
|-id=041 bgcolor=#fefefe
| 126041 ||  || — || December 18, 2001 || Socorro || LINEAR || MAS || align=right | 1.5 km || 
|-id=042 bgcolor=#E9E9E9
| 126042 ||  || — || December 18, 2001 || Socorro || LINEAR || — || align=right | 3.4 km || 
|-id=043 bgcolor=#E9E9E9
| 126043 ||  || — || December 18, 2001 || Socorro || LINEAR || — || align=right | 2.2 km || 
|-id=044 bgcolor=#E9E9E9
| 126044 ||  || — || December 18, 2001 || Socorro || LINEAR || — || align=right | 4.7 km || 
|-id=045 bgcolor=#fefefe
| 126045 ||  || — || December 18, 2001 || Socorro || LINEAR || NYS || align=right | 1.3 km || 
|-id=046 bgcolor=#fefefe
| 126046 ||  || — || December 18, 2001 || Socorro || LINEAR || NYS || align=right | 1.1 km || 
|-id=047 bgcolor=#E9E9E9
| 126047 ||  || — || December 18, 2001 || Socorro || LINEAR || — || align=right | 1.9 km || 
|-id=048 bgcolor=#E9E9E9
| 126048 ||  || — || December 18, 2001 || Socorro || LINEAR || — || align=right | 2.3 km || 
|-id=049 bgcolor=#E9E9E9
| 126049 ||  || — || December 18, 2001 || Socorro || LINEAR || — || align=right | 3.4 km || 
|-id=050 bgcolor=#fefefe
| 126050 ||  || — || December 18, 2001 || Socorro || LINEAR || — || align=right | 1.6 km || 
|-id=051 bgcolor=#d6d6d6
| 126051 ||  || — || December 18, 2001 || Socorro || LINEAR || KOR || align=right | 2.5 km || 
|-id=052 bgcolor=#fefefe
| 126052 ||  || — || December 18, 2001 || Socorro || LINEAR || — || align=right | 1.4 km || 
|-id=053 bgcolor=#fefefe
| 126053 ||  || — || December 18, 2001 || Socorro || LINEAR || NYS || align=right | 1.4 km || 
|-id=054 bgcolor=#fefefe
| 126054 ||  || — || December 18, 2001 || Socorro || LINEAR || V || align=right | 1.4 km || 
|-id=055 bgcolor=#fefefe
| 126055 ||  || — || December 18, 2001 || Socorro || LINEAR || — || align=right | 1.1 km || 
|-id=056 bgcolor=#fefefe
| 126056 ||  || — || December 18, 2001 || Socorro || LINEAR || — || align=right | 1.4 km || 
|-id=057 bgcolor=#fefefe
| 126057 ||  || — || December 18, 2001 || Socorro || LINEAR || NYS || align=right | 1.2 km || 
|-id=058 bgcolor=#E9E9E9
| 126058 ||  || — || December 18, 2001 || Socorro || LINEAR || — || align=right | 2.7 km || 
|-id=059 bgcolor=#fefefe
| 126059 ||  || — || December 18, 2001 || Socorro || LINEAR || — || align=right | 3.3 km || 
|-id=060 bgcolor=#E9E9E9
| 126060 ||  || — || December 18, 2001 || Socorro || LINEAR || — || align=right | 2.8 km || 
|-id=061 bgcolor=#fefefe
| 126061 ||  || — || December 18, 2001 || Socorro || LINEAR || — || align=right | 1.6 km || 
|-id=062 bgcolor=#fefefe
| 126062 ||  || — || December 18, 2001 || Socorro || LINEAR || — || align=right | 1.5 km || 
|-id=063 bgcolor=#d6d6d6
| 126063 ||  || — || December 18, 2001 || Socorro || LINEAR || THM || align=right | 5.1 km || 
|-id=064 bgcolor=#E9E9E9
| 126064 ||  || — || December 18, 2001 || Socorro || LINEAR || — || align=right | 3.3 km || 
|-id=065 bgcolor=#E9E9E9
| 126065 ||  || — || December 18, 2001 || Socorro || LINEAR || — || align=right | 2.0 km || 
|-id=066 bgcolor=#E9E9E9
| 126066 ||  || — || December 18, 2001 || Socorro || LINEAR || — || align=right | 2.5 km || 
|-id=067 bgcolor=#fefefe
| 126067 ||  || — || December 18, 2001 || Socorro || LINEAR || NYS || align=right | 1.4 km || 
|-id=068 bgcolor=#E9E9E9
| 126068 ||  || — || December 18, 2001 || Socorro || LINEAR || NEM || align=right | 3.6 km || 
|-id=069 bgcolor=#fefefe
| 126069 ||  || — || December 18, 2001 || Socorro || LINEAR || — || align=right | 1.9 km || 
|-id=070 bgcolor=#fefefe
| 126070 ||  || — || December 18, 2001 || Socorro || LINEAR || — || align=right | 1.6 km || 
|-id=071 bgcolor=#fefefe
| 126071 ||  || — || December 18, 2001 || Socorro || LINEAR || MAS || align=right | 1.6 km || 
|-id=072 bgcolor=#E9E9E9
| 126072 ||  || — || December 18, 2001 || Socorro || LINEAR || — || align=right | 4.1 km || 
|-id=073 bgcolor=#E9E9E9
| 126073 ||  || — || December 18, 2001 || Socorro || LINEAR || — || align=right | 2.1 km || 
|-id=074 bgcolor=#E9E9E9
| 126074 ||  || — || December 18, 2001 || Socorro || LINEAR || HOF || align=right | 5.3 km || 
|-id=075 bgcolor=#E9E9E9
| 126075 ||  || — || December 18, 2001 || Socorro || LINEAR || — || align=right | 2.2 km || 
|-id=076 bgcolor=#fefefe
| 126076 ||  || — || December 18, 2001 || Socorro || LINEAR || NYS || align=right | 2.0 km || 
|-id=077 bgcolor=#E9E9E9
| 126077 ||  || — || December 18, 2001 || Socorro || LINEAR || — || align=right | 5.7 km || 
|-id=078 bgcolor=#fefefe
| 126078 ||  || — || December 18, 2001 || Socorro || LINEAR || — || align=right | 1.9 km || 
|-id=079 bgcolor=#E9E9E9
| 126079 ||  || — || December 18, 2001 || Socorro || LINEAR || — || align=right | 2.0 km || 
|-id=080 bgcolor=#fefefe
| 126080 ||  || — || December 18, 2001 || Socorro || LINEAR || NYS || align=right | 1.3 km || 
|-id=081 bgcolor=#fefefe
| 126081 ||  || — || December 18, 2001 || Socorro || LINEAR || V || align=right | 1.5 km || 
|-id=082 bgcolor=#E9E9E9
| 126082 ||  || — || December 18, 2001 || Socorro || LINEAR || — || align=right | 3.9 km || 
|-id=083 bgcolor=#fefefe
| 126083 ||  || — || December 17, 2001 || Palomar || NEAT || V || align=right | 1.3 km || 
|-id=084 bgcolor=#fefefe
| 126084 ||  || — || December 17, 2001 || Palomar || NEAT || — || align=right | 1.3 km || 
|-id=085 bgcolor=#fefefe
| 126085 ||  || — || December 18, 2001 || Kitt Peak || Spacewatch || — || align=right | 1.3 km || 
|-id=086 bgcolor=#fefefe
| 126086 ||  || — || December 17, 2001 || Palomar || NEAT || NYS || align=right | 1.4 km || 
|-id=087 bgcolor=#E9E9E9
| 126087 ||  || — || December 17, 2001 || Palomar || NEAT || — || align=right | 5.6 km || 
|-id=088 bgcolor=#fefefe
| 126088 ||  || — || December 18, 2001 || Palomar || NEAT || — || align=right | 1.8 km || 
|-id=089 bgcolor=#fefefe
| 126089 ||  || — || December 18, 2001 || Palomar || NEAT || V || align=right | 1.1 km || 
|-id=090 bgcolor=#fefefe
| 126090 ||  || — || December 17, 2001 || Socorro || LINEAR || — || align=right | 1.4 km || 
|-id=091 bgcolor=#fefefe
| 126091 ||  || — || December 17, 2001 || Socorro || LINEAR || NYS || align=right | 1.00 km || 
|-id=092 bgcolor=#E9E9E9
| 126092 ||  || — || December 17, 2001 || Socorro || LINEAR || — || align=right | 2.4 km || 
|-id=093 bgcolor=#E9E9E9
| 126093 ||  || — || December 17, 2001 || Socorro || LINEAR || — || align=right | 2.1 km || 
|-id=094 bgcolor=#d6d6d6
| 126094 ||  || — || December 17, 2001 || Socorro || LINEAR || KOR || align=right | 2.6 km || 
|-id=095 bgcolor=#E9E9E9
| 126095 ||  || — || December 17, 2001 || Socorro || LINEAR || — || align=right | 4.0 km || 
|-id=096 bgcolor=#E9E9E9
| 126096 ||  || — || December 17, 2001 || Socorro || LINEAR || — || align=right | 1.9 km || 
|-id=097 bgcolor=#E9E9E9
| 126097 ||  || — || December 17, 2001 || Socorro || LINEAR || ADE || align=right | 5.4 km || 
|-id=098 bgcolor=#fefefe
| 126098 ||  || — || December 17, 2001 || Socorro || LINEAR || NYS || align=right | 1.4 km || 
|-id=099 bgcolor=#E9E9E9
| 126099 ||  || — || December 17, 2001 || Socorro || LINEAR || — || align=right | 3.9 km || 
|-id=100 bgcolor=#E9E9E9
| 126100 ||  || — || December 17, 2001 || Socorro || LINEAR || — || align=right | 1.6 km || 
|}

126101–126200 

|-bgcolor=#fefefe
| 126101 ||  || — || December 17, 2001 || Socorro || LINEAR || V || align=right | 1.3 km || 
|-id=102 bgcolor=#fefefe
| 126102 ||  || — || December 17, 2001 || Socorro || LINEAR || MAS || align=right | 1.5 km || 
|-id=103 bgcolor=#E9E9E9
| 126103 ||  || — || December 17, 2001 || Socorro || LINEAR || — || align=right | 2.0 km || 
|-id=104 bgcolor=#E9E9E9
| 126104 ||  || — || December 17, 2001 || Socorro || LINEAR || — || align=right | 2.1 km || 
|-id=105 bgcolor=#E9E9E9
| 126105 ||  || — || December 17, 2001 || Socorro || LINEAR || — || align=right | 4.4 km || 
|-id=106 bgcolor=#fefefe
| 126106 ||  || — || December 18, 2001 || Socorro || LINEAR || V || align=right | 1.0 km || 
|-id=107 bgcolor=#E9E9E9
| 126107 ||  || — || December 18, 2001 || Socorro || LINEAR || — || align=right | 2.2 km || 
|-id=108 bgcolor=#E9E9E9
| 126108 ||  || — || December 18, 2001 || Socorro || LINEAR || — || align=right | 4.8 km || 
|-id=109 bgcolor=#E9E9E9
| 126109 ||  || — || December 18, 2001 || Socorro || LINEAR || — || align=right | 2.4 km || 
|-id=110 bgcolor=#fefefe
| 126110 ||  || — || December 18, 2001 || Anderson Mesa || LONEOS || V || align=right | 2.4 km || 
|-id=111 bgcolor=#fefefe
| 126111 ||  || — || December 18, 2001 || Anderson Mesa || LONEOS || V || align=right | 1.3 km || 
|-id=112 bgcolor=#E9E9E9
| 126112 ||  || — || December 18, 2001 || Anderson Mesa || LONEOS || HNS || align=right | 2.7 km || 
|-id=113 bgcolor=#fefefe
| 126113 ||  || — || December 18, 2001 || Anderson Mesa || LONEOS || V || align=right | 1.4 km || 
|-id=114 bgcolor=#fefefe
| 126114 ||  || — || December 19, 2001 || Socorro || LINEAR || — || align=right | 2.4 km || 
|-id=115 bgcolor=#fefefe
| 126115 ||  || — || December 19, 2001 || Socorro || LINEAR || — || align=right | 1.6 km || 
|-id=116 bgcolor=#E9E9E9
| 126116 ||  || — || December 17, 2001 || Palomar || NEAT || ADE || align=right | 4.9 km || 
|-id=117 bgcolor=#E9E9E9
| 126117 ||  || — || December 19, 2001 || Socorro || LINEAR || — || align=right | 2.8 km || 
|-id=118 bgcolor=#fefefe
| 126118 ||  || — || December 17, 2001 || Palomar || NEAT || — || align=right | 1.5 km || 
|-id=119 bgcolor=#d6d6d6
| 126119 ||  || — || December 19, 2001 || Socorro || LINEAR || 7:4 || align=right | 5.8 km || 
|-id=120 bgcolor=#fefefe
| 126120 ||  || — || December 17, 2001 || Socorro || LINEAR || — || align=right | 2.2 km || 
|-id=121 bgcolor=#E9E9E9
| 126121 ||  || — || December 17, 2001 || Socorro || LINEAR || WIT || align=right | 2.0 km || 
|-id=122 bgcolor=#fefefe
| 126122 ||  || — || December 17, 2001 || Socorro || LINEAR || — || align=right | 1.6 km || 
|-id=123 bgcolor=#fefefe
| 126123 ||  || — || December 17, 2001 || Socorro || LINEAR || — || align=right | 2.3 km || 
|-id=124 bgcolor=#fefefe
| 126124 ||  || — || December 18, 2001 || Socorro || LINEAR || — || align=right | 1.3 km || 
|-id=125 bgcolor=#fefefe
| 126125 ||  || — || December 18, 2001 || Socorro || LINEAR || — || align=right | 2.0 km || 
|-id=126 bgcolor=#E9E9E9
| 126126 ||  || — || December 19, 2001 || Socorro || LINEAR || MAR || align=right | 2.9 km || 
|-id=127 bgcolor=#E9E9E9
| 126127 ||  || — || December 19, 2001 || Socorro || LINEAR || — || align=right | 3.8 km || 
|-id=128 bgcolor=#fefefe
| 126128 ||  || — || December 20, 2001 || Socorro || LINEAR || — || align=right | 1.4 km || 
|-id=129 bgcolor=#E9E9E9
| 126129 ||  || — || December 20, 2001 || Socorro || LINEAR || MAR || align=right | 2.0 km || 
|-id=130 bgcolor=#E9E9E9
| 126130 ||  || — || December 20, 2001 || Kitt Peak || Spacewatch || EUN || align=right | 2.5 km || 
|-id=131 bgcolor=#fefefe
| 126131 ||  || — || December 17, 2001 || Socorro || LINEAR || FLO || align=right | 1.9 km || 
|-id=132 bgcolor=#fefefe
| 126132 ||  || — || December 17, 2001 || Socorro || LINEAR || V || align=right | 1.1 km || 
|-id=133 bgcolor=#fefefe
| 126133 ||  || — || December 17, 2001 || Socorro || LINEAR || FLO || align=right | 1.4 km || 
|-id=134 bgcolor=#fefefe
| 126134 ||  || — || December 17, 2001 || Socorro || LINEAR || V || align=right | 1.2 km || 
|-id=135 bgcolor=#fefefe
| 126135 ||  || — || December 17, 2001 || Socorro || LINEAR || FLO || align=right | 1.7 km || 
|-id=136 bgcolor=#fefefe
| 126136 ||  || — || December 17, 2001 || Socorro || LINEAR || FLO || align=right | 1.3 km || 
|-id=137 bgcolor=#E9E9E9
| 126137 ||  || — || December 17, 2001 || Socorro || LINEAR || — || align=right | 3.7 km || 
|-id=138 bgcolor=#E9E9E9
| 126138 ||  || — || December 17, 2001 || Socorro || LINEAR || — || align=right | 2.4 km || 
|-id=139 bgcolor=#E9E9E9
| 126139 ||  || — || December 17, 2001 || Socorro || LINEAR || EUN || align=right | 1.8 km || 
|-id=140 bgcolor=#fefefe
| 126140 ||  || — || December 17, 2001 || Socorro || LINEAR || — || align=right | 1.7 km || 
|-id=141 bgcolor=#E9E9E9
| 126141 ||  || — || December 17, 2001 || Socorro || LINEAR || — || align=right | 3.9 km || 
|-id=142 bgcolor=#E9E9E9
| 126142 ||  || — || December 17, 2001 || Socorro || LINEAR || — || align=right | 2.6 km || 
|-id=143 bgcolor=#E9E9E9
| 126143 ||  || — || December 17, 2001 || Socorro || LINEAR || — || align=right | 1.9 km || 
|-id=144 bgcolor=#fefefe
| 126144 ||  || — || December 17, 2001 || Socorro || LINEAR || FLO || align=right | 1.4 km || 
|-id=145 bgcolor=#fefefe
| 126145 ||  || — || December 19, 2001 || Socorro || LINEAR || — || align=right | 1.6 km || 
|-id=146 bgcolor=#fefefe
| 126146 ||  || — || December 20, 2001 || Socorro || LINEAR || V || align=right | 1.5 km || 
|-id=147 bgcolor=#fefefe
| 126147 ||  || — || December 17, 2001 || Socorro || LINEAR || — || align=right | 1.2 km || 
|-id=148 bgcolor=#E9E9E9
| 126148 ||  || — || December 18, 2001 || Socorro || LINEAR || GER || align=right | 3.3 km || 
|-id=149 bgcolor=#E9E9E9
| 126149 ||  || — || December 20, 2001 || Socorro || LINEAR || HNS || align=right | 2.5 km || 
|-id=150 bgcolor=#fefefe
| 126150 ||  || — || December 22, 2001 || Socorro || LINEAR || — || align=right | 4.5 km || 
|-id=151 bgcolor=#E9E9E9
| 126151 ||  || — || December 22, 2001 || Socorro || LINEAR || — || align=right | 2.7 km || 
|-id=152 bgcolor=#E9E9E9
| 126152 ||  || — || December 18, 2001 || Kitt Peak || Spacewatch || — || align=right | 1.8 km || 
|-id=153 bgcolor=#fefefe
| 126153 ||  || — || December 24, 2001 || Palomar || NEAT || — || align=right | 2.3 km || 
|-id=154 bgcolor=#C2E0FF
| 126154 ||  || — || December 18, 2001 || Palomar || C. Trujillo, M. E. Brown || res3:5 || align=right | 339 km || 
|-id=155 bgcolor=#C2E0FF
| 126155 ||  || — || December 20, 2001 || Palomar || C. Trujillo, G. Smith, M. E. Brown || plutino || align=right | 138 km || 
|-id=156 bgcolor=#fefefe
| 126156 ||  || — || December 19, 2001 || Palomar || NEAT || V || align=right | 1.9 km || 
|-id=157 bgcolor=#E9E9E9
| 126157 ||  || — || December 19, 2001 || Socorro || LINEAR || — || align=right | 2.3 km || 
|-id=158 bgcolor=#fefefe
| 126158 ||  || — || December 19, 2001 || Palomar || NEAT || V || align=right | 1.2 km || 
|-id=159 bgcolor=#E9E9E9
| 126159 ||  || — || December 20, 2001 || Socorro || LINEAR || HNS || align=right | 3.3 km || 
|-id=160 bgcolor=#E9E9E9
| 126160 Fabienkuntz || 2002 AF ||  || January 4, 2002 || Vicques || M. Ory || — || align=right | 4.0 km || 
|-id=161 bgcolor=#fefefe
| 126161 || 2002 AK || — || January 4, 2002 || San Marcello || A. Boattini, M. Tombelli || — || align=right | 2.3 km || 
|-id=162 bgcolor=#fefefe
| 126162 || 2002 AY || — || January 13, 2002 || Socorro || LINEAR || — || align=right | 1.9 km || 
|-id=163 bgcolor=#fefefe
| 126163 ||  || — || January 5, 2002 || Haleakala || NEAT || — || align=right | 2.1 km || 
|-id=164 bgcolor=#fefefe
| 126164 ||  || — || January 6, 2002 || Oizumi || T. Kobayashi || MAS || align=right | 1.4 km || 
|-id=165 bgcolor=#fefefe
| 126165 ||  || — || January 8, 2002 || Oizumi || T. Kobayashi || NYS || align=right | 1.8 km || 
|-id=166 bgcolor=#E9E9E9
| 126166 ||  || — || January 8, 2002 || Socorro || LINEAR || BAR || align=right | 2.1 km || 
|-id=167 bgcolor=#fefefe
| 126167 ||  || — || January 9, 2002 || Oizumi || T. Kobayashi || — || align=right | 5.0 km || 
|-id=168 bgcolor=#E9E9E9
| 126168 ||  || — || January 5, 2002 || Kitt Peak || Spacewatch || AGN || align=right | 1.9 km || 
|-id=169 bgcolor=#fefefe
| 126169 ||  || — || January 2, 2002 || Haleakala || NEAT || — || align=right | 5.0 km || 
|-id=170 bgcolor=#E9E9E9
| 126170 ||  || — || January 5, 2002 || Palomar || NEAT || — || align=right | 1.7 km || 
|-id=171 bgcolor=#E9E9E9
| 126171 ||  || — || January 7, 2002 || Kitt Peak || Spacewatch || — || align=right | 2.4 km || 
|-id=172 bgcolor=#E9E9E9
| 126172 ||  || — || January 9, 2002 || Bohyunsan || Bohyunsan Obs. || — || align=right | 1.3 km || 
|-id=173 bgcolor=#E9E9E9
| 126173 ||  || — || January 11, 2002 || Farpoint || G. Hug || — || align=right | 3.8 km || 
|-id=174 bgcolor=#E9E9E9
| 126174 ||  || — || January 11, 2002 || Desert Eagle || W. K. Y. Yeung || — || align=right | 1.9 km || 
|-id=175 bgcolor=#fefefe
| 126175 ||  || — || January 4, 2002 || Haleakala || NEAT || NYS || align=right | 2.1 km || 
|-id=176 bgcolor=#fefefe
| 126176 ||  || — || January 5, 2002 || Haleakala || NEAT || NYS || align=right | 1.8 km || 
|-id=177 bgcolor=#fefefe
| 126177 ||  || — || January 10, 2002 || Campo Imperatore || CINEOS || KLI || align=right | 4.5 km || 
|-id=178 bgcolor=#E9E9E9
| 126178 ||  || — || January 12, 2002 || Desert Eagle || W. K. Y. Yeung || — || align=right | 2.0 km || 
|-id=179 bgcolor=#E9E9E9
| 126179 ||  || — || January 12, 2002 || Desert Eagle || W. K. Y. Yeung || — || align=right | 2.6 km || 
|-id=180 bgcolor=#E9E9E9
| 126180 ||  || — || January 12, 2002 || Desert Eagle || W. K. Y. Yeung || — || align=right | 4.1 km || 
|-id=181 bgcolor=#E9E9E9
| 126181 ||  || — || January 4, 2002 || Haleakala || NEAT || — || align=right | 5.5 km || 
|-id=182 bgcolor=#E9E9E9
| 126182 ||  || — || January 8, 2002 || Kitt Peak || Spacewatch || — || align=right | 2.3 km || 
|-id=183 bgcolor=#fefefe
| 126183 ||  || — || January 8, 2002 || Needville || Needville Obs. || — || align=right | 2.3 km || 
|-id=184 bgcolor=#E9E9E9
| 126184 ||  || — || January 8, 2002 || Socorro || LINEAR || — || align=right | 4.1 km || 
|-id=185 bgcolor=#E9E9E9
| 126185 ||  || — || January 5, 2002 || Palomar || NEAT || — || align=right | 4.5 km || 
|-id=186 bgcolor=#E9E9E9
| 126186 ||  || — || January 7, 2002 || Palomar || NEAT || AER || align=right | 2.4 km || 
|-id=187 bgcolor=#fefefe
| 126187 ||  || — || January 7, 2002 || Socorro || LINEAR || — || align=right | 3.0 km || 
|-id=188 bgcolor=#fefefe
| 126188 ||  || — || January 9, 2002 || Socorro || LINEAR || PHO || align=right | 3.2 km || 
|-id=189 bgcolor=#fefefe
| 126189 ||  || — || January 9, 2002 || Kitt Peak || Spacewatch || — || align=right | 2.6 km || 
|-id=190 bgcolor=#fefefe
| 126190 ||  || — || January 7, 2002 || Haleakala || NEAT || — || align=right | 1.9 km || 
|-id=191 bgcolor=#fefefe
| 126191 ||  || — || January 15, 2002 || Socorro || LINEAR || FLO || align=right | 1.1 km || 
|-id=192 bgcolor=#E9E9E9
| 126192 ||  || — || January 5, 2002 || Haleakala || NEAT || — || align=right | 1.9 km || 
|-id=193 bgcolor=#E9E9E9
| 126193 ||  || — || January 9, 2002 || Kitt Peak || Spacewatch || — || align=right | 1.4 km || 
|-id=194 bgcolor=#fefefe
| 126194 ||  || — || January 9, 2002 || Socorro || LINEAR || — || align=right | 1.6 km || 
|-id=195 bgcolor=#E9E9E9
| 126195 ||  || — || January 8, 2002 || Palomar || NEAT || — || align=right | 2.4 km || 
|-id=196 bgcolor=#fefefe
| 126196 ||  || — || January 7, 2002 || Kitt Peak || Spacewatch || NYS || align=right | 1.3 km || 
|-id=197 bgcolor=#fefefe
| 126197 ||  || — || January 9, 2002 || Socorro || LINEAR || NYS || align=right | 1.3 km || 
|-id=198 bgcolor=#fefefe
| 126198 ||  || — || January 9, 2002 || Socorro || LINEAR || — || align=right | 1.6 km || 
|-id=199 bgcolor=#E9E9E9
| 126199 ||  || — || January 9, 2002 || Socorro || LINEAR || — || align=right | 1.8 km || 
|-id=200 bgcolor=#E9E9E9
| 126200 ||  || — || January 9, 2002 || Socorro || LINEAR || — || align=right | 2.0 km || 
|}

126201–126300 

|-bgcolor=#E9E9E9
| 126201 ||  || — || January 9, 2002 || Socorro || LINEAR || — || align=right | 2.5 km || 
|-id=202 bgcolor=#fefefe
| 126202 ||  || — || January 9, 2002 || Socorro || LINEAR || — || align=right | 2.9 km || 
|-id=203 bgcolor=#fefefe
| 126203 ||  || — || January 9, 2002 || Socorro || LINEAR || NYS || align=right | 1.3 km || 
|-id=204 bgcolor=#E9E9E9
| 126204 ||  || — || January 9, 2002 || Socorro || LINEAR || JUN || align=right | 5.3 km || 
|-id=205 bgcolor=#fefefe
| 126205 ||  || — || January 9, 2002 || Socorro || LINEAR || — || align=right | 1.3 km || 
|-id=206 bgcolor=#E9E9E9
| 126206 ||  || — || January 9, 2002 || Socorro || LINEAR || — || align=right | 2.1 km || 
|-id=207 bgcolor=#E9E9E9
| 126207 ||  || — || January 9, 2002 || Socorro || LINEAR || — || align=right | 3.9 km || 
|-id=208 bgcolor=#fefefe
| 126208 ||  || — || January 9, 2002 || Socorro || LINEAR || NYS || align=right | 1.2 km || 
|-id=209 bgcolor=#fefefe
| 126209 ||  || — || January 9, 2002 || Socorro || LINEAR || — || align=right | 2.2 km || 
|-id=210 bgcolor=#fefefe
| 126210 ||  || — || January 9, 2002 || Socorro || LINEAR || — || align=right | 1.6 km || 
|-id=211 bgcolor=#fefefe
| 126211 ||  || — || January 9, 2002 || Socorro || LINEAR || — || align=right | 1.6 km || 
|-id=212 bgcolor=#E9E9E9
| 126212 ||  || — || January 9, 2002 || Socorro || LINEAR || — || align=right | 2.9 km || 
|-id=213 bgcolor=#fefefe
| 126213 ||  || — || January 9, 2002 || Socorro || LINEAR || — || align=right | 1.6 km || 
|-id=214 bgcolor=#E9E9E9
| 126214 ||  || — || January 9, 2002 || Socorro || LINEAR || — || align=right | 1.7 km || 
|-id=215 bgcolor=#E9E9E9
| 126215 ||  || — || January 9, 2002 || Socorro || LINEAR || — || align=right | 2.2 km || 
|-id=216 bgcolor=#E9E9E9
| 126216 ||  || — || January 9, 2002 || Socorro || LINEAR || — || align=right | 3.9 km || 
|-id=217 bgcolor=#fefefe
| 126217 ||  || — || January 9, 2002 || Socorro || LINEAR || NYS || align=right data-sort-value="0.90" | 900 m || 
|-id=218 bgcolor=#E9E9E9
| 126218 ||  || — || January 9, 2002 || Socorro || LINEAR || — || align=right | 2.2 km || 
|-id=219 bgcolor=#d6d6d6
| 126219 ||  || — || January 9, 2002 || Socorro || LINEAR || KOR || align=right | 2.8 km || 
|-id=220 bgcolor=#E9E9E9
| 126220 ||  || — || January 9, 2002 || Socorro || LINEAR || WIT || align=right | 1.8 km || 
|-id=221 bgcolor=#E9E9E9
| 126221 ||  || — || January 9, 2002 || Socorro || LINEAR || — || align=right | 4.0 km || 
|-id=222 bgcolor=#fefefe
| 126222 ||  || — || January 9, 2002 || Socorro || LINEAR || MAS || align=right | 1.6 km || 
|-id=223 bgcolor=#E9E9E9
| 126223 ||  || — || January 9, 2002 || Socorro || LINEAR || — || align=right | 2.1 km || 
|-id=224 bgcolor=#fefefe
| 126224 ||  || — || January 9, 2002 || Socorro || LINEAR || — || align=right | 1.4 km || 
|-id=225 bgcolor=#E9E9E9
| 126225 ||  || — || January 9, 2002 || Socorro || LINEAR || — || align=right | 1.8 km || 
|-id=226 bgcolor=#fefefe
| 126226 ||  || — || January 9, 2002 || Socorro || LINEAR || NYS || align=right | 1.5 km || 
|-id=227 bgcolor=#E9E9E9
| 126227 ||  || — || January 9, 2002 || Socorro || LINEAR || — || align=right | 2.8 km || 
|-id=228 bgcolor=#E9E9E9
| 126228 ||  || — || January 9, 2002 || Socorro || LINEAR || — || align=right | 3.0 km || 
|-id=229 bgcolor=#fefefe
| 126229 ||  || — || January 9, 2002 || Socorro || LINEAR || — || align=right | 1.3 km || 
|-id=230 bgcolor=#E9E9E9
| 126230 ||  || — || January 9, 2002 || Socorro || LINEAR || HOF || align=right | 4.7 km || 
|-id=231 bgcolor=#d6d6d6
| 126231 ||  || — || January 9, 2002 || Socorro || LINEAR || KOR || align=right | 2.4 km || 
|-id=232 bgcolor=#E9E9E9
| 126232 ||  || — || January 9, 2002 || Socorro || LINEAR || MAR || align=right | 2.0 km || 
|-id=233 bgcolor=#E9E9E9
| 126233 ||  || — || January 9, 2002 || Socorro || LINEAR || — || align=right | 2.3 km || 
|-id=234 bgcolor=#E9E9E9
| 126234 ||  || — || January 9, 2002 || Socorro || LINEAR || — || align=right | 2.5 km || 
|-id=235 bgcolor=#fefefe
| 126235 ||  || — || January 9, 2002 || Socorro || LINEAR || NYS || align=right | 1.5 km || 
|-id=236 bgcolor=#E9E9E9
| 126236 ||  || — || January 9, 2002 || Socorro || LINEAR || — || align=right | 1.9 km || 
|-id=237 bgcolor=#E9E9E9
| 126237 ||  || — || January 9, 2002 || Socorro || LINEAR || — || align=right | 5.4 km || 
|-id=238 bgcolor=#fefefe
| 126238 ||  || — || January 9, 2002 || Socorro || LINEAR || NYS || align=right | 1.1 km || 
|-id=239 bgcolor=#fefefe
| 126239 ||  || — || January 9, 2002 || Socorro || LINEAR || — || align=right | 3.0 km || 
|-id=240 bgcolor=#E9E9E9
| 126240 ||  || — || January 11, 2002 || Socorro || LINEAR || — || align=right | 5.3 km || 
|-id=241 bgcolor=#E9E9E9
| 126241 ||  || — || January 11, 2002 || Socorro || LINEAR || CLO || align=right | 4.4 km || 
|-id=242 bgcolor=#E9E9E9
| 126242 ||  || — || January 11, 2002 || Socorro || LINEAR || — || align=right | 4.0 km || 
|-id=243 bgcolor=#E9E9E9
| 126243 ||  || — || January 11, 2002 || Socorro || LINEAR || — || align=right | 5.0 km || 
|-id=244 bgcolor=#E9E9E9
| 126244 ||  || — || January 12, 2002 || Socorro || LINEAR || — || align=right | 2.4 km || 
|-id=245 bgcolor=#fefefe
| 126245 Kandókálmán ||  ||  || January 13, 2002 || Piszkéstető || K. Sárneczky, Z. Heiner || — || align=right | 1.3 km || 
|-id=246 bgcolor=#E9E9E9
| 126246 ||  || — || January 9, 2002 || Campo Imperatore || CINEOS || — || align=right | 4.3 km || 
|-id=247 bgcolor=#fefefe
| 126247 ||  || — || January 9, 2002 || Campo Imperatore || CINEOS || — || align=right | 1.7 km || 
|-id=248 bgcolor=#fefefe
| 126248 ||  || — || January 9, 2002 || Campo Imperatore || CINEOS || NYS || align=right | 1.4 km || 
|-id=249 bgcolor=#fefefe
| 126249 ||  || — || January 9, 2002 || Campo Imperatore || CINEOS || NYS || align=right | 1.3 km || 
|-id=250 bgcolor=#fefefe
| 126250 ||  || — || January 8, 2002 || Socorro || LINEAR || — || align=right | 4.1 km || 
|-id=251 bgcolor=#fefefe
| 126251 ||  || — || January 8, 2002 || Socorro || LINEAR || KLI || align=right | 3.3 km || 
|-id=252 bgcolor=#E9E9E9
| 126252 ||  || — || January 8, 2002 || Socorro || LINEAR || — || align=right | 2.2 km || 
|-id=253 bgcolor=#E9E9E9
| 126253 ||  || — || January 8, 2002 || Socorro || LINEAR || — || align=right | 1.8 km || 
|-id=254 bgcolor=#E9E9E9
| 126254 ||  || — || January 8, 2002 || Socorro || LINEAR || MIS || align=right | 4.3 km || 
|-id=255 bgcolor=#E9E9E9
| 126255 ||  || — || January 8, 2002 || Socorro || LINEAR || — || align=right | 7.5 km || 
|-id=256 bgcolor=#fefefe
| 126256 ||  || — || January 8, 2002 || Socorro || LINEAR || — || align=right | 2.1 km || 
|-id=257 bgcolor=#fefefe
| 126257 ||  || — || January 8, 2002 || Socorro || LINEAR || — || align=right | 1.3 km || 
|-id=258 bgcolor=#E9E9E9
| 126258 ||  || — || January 8, 2002 || Socorro || LINEAR || — || align=right | 1.6 km || 
|-id=259 bgcolor=#E9E9E9
| 126259 ||  || — || January 8, 2002 || Socorro || LINEAR || MRX || align=right | 2.4 km || 
|-id=260 bgcolor=#fefefe
| 126260 ||  || — || January 8, 2002 || Socorro || LINEAR || — || align=right | 1.3 km || 
|-id=261 bgcolor=#E9E9E9
| 126261 ||  || — || January 8, 2002 || Socorro || LINEAR || PAD || align=right | 2.8 km || 
|-id=262 bgcolor=#fefefe
| 126262 ||  || — || January 9, 2002 || Socorro || LINEAR || V || align=right | 1.3 km || 
|-id=263 bgcolor=#fefefe
| 126263 ||  || — || January 9, 2002 || Socorro || LINEAR || V || align=right | 1.5 km || 
|-id=264 bgcolor=#fefefe
| 126264 ||  || — || January 9, 2002 || Socorro || LINEAR || — || align=right | 2.1 km || 
|-id=265 bgcolor=#fefefe
| 126265 ||  || — || January 9, 2002 || Socorro || LINEAR || — || align=right | 1.7 km || 
|-id=266 bgcolor=#fefefe
| 126266 ||  || — || January 9, 2002 || Socorro || LINEAR || — || align=right | 1.6 km || 
|-id=267 bgcolor=#fefefe
| 126267 ||  || — || January 9, 2002 || Socorro || LINEAR || — || align=right | 2.0 km || 
|-id=268 bgcolor=#fefefe
| 126268 ||  || — || January 9, 2002 || Socorro || LINEAR || — || align=right | 1.6 km || 
|-id=269 bgcolor=#E9E9E9
| 126269 ||  || — || January 9, 2002 || Socorro || LINEAR || PAD || align=right | 2.5 km || 
|-id=270 bgcolor=#E9E9E9
| 126270 ||  || — || January 11, 2002 || Socorro || LINEAR || — || align=right | 2.0 km || 
|-id=271 bgcolor=#E9E9E9
| 126271 ||  || — || January 11, 2002 || Socorro || LINEAR || EUN || align=right | 2.7 km || 
|-id=272 bgcolor=#E9E9E9
| 126272 ||  || — || January 11, 2002 || Socorro || LINEAR || — || align=right | 1.9 km || 
|-id=273 bgcolor=#E9E9E9
| 126273 ||  || — || January 8, 2002 || Socorro || LINEAR || AEO || align=right | 2.2 km || 
|-id=274 bgcolor=#E9E9E9
| 126274 ||  || — || January 8, 2002 || Socorro || LINEAR || MRX || align=right | 1.9 km || 
|-id=275 bgcolor=#E9E9E9
| 126275 ||  || — || January 8, 2002 || Socorro || LINEAR || — || align=right | 1.8 km || 
|-id=276 bgcolor=#E9E9E9
| 126276 ||  || — || January 8, 2002 || Socorro || LINEAR || HEN || align=right | 1.7 km || 
|-id=277 bgcolor=#E9E9E9
| 126277 ||  || — || January 8, 2002 || Socorro || LINEAR || — || align=right | 5.0 km || 
|-id=278 bgcolor=#E9E9E9
| 126278 ||  || — || January 8, 2002 || Socorro || LINEAR || — || align=right | 1.5 km || 
|-id=279 bgcolor=#fefefe
| 126279 ||  || — || January 8, 2002 || Socorro || LINEAR || FLO || align=right | 1.5 km || 
|-id=280 bgcolor=#fefefe
| 126280 ||  || — || January 8, 2002 || Socorro || LINEAR || — || align=right | 1.6 km || 
|-id=281 bgcolor=#fefefe
| 126281 ||  || — || January 8, 2002 || Socorro || LINEAR || — || align=right | 1.6 km || 
|-id=282 bgcolor=#fefefe
| 126282 ||  || — || January 8, 2002 || Socorro || LINEAR || ERI || align=right | 2.4 km || 
|-id=283 bgcolor=#E9E9E9
| 126283 ||  || — || January 8, 2002 || Socorro || LINEAR || — || align=right | 2.0 km || 
|-id=284 bgcolor=#fefefe
| 126284 ||  || — || January 8, 2002 || Socorro || LINEAR || NYS || align=right | 1.3 km || 
|-id=285 bgcolor=#d6d6d6
| 126285 ||  || — || January 9, 2002 || Socorro || LINEAR || EOS || align=right | 3.1 km || 
|-id=286 bgcolor=#E9E9E9
| 126286 ||  || — || January 9, 2002 || Socorro || LINEAR || — || align=right | 1.7 km || 
|-id=287 bgcolor=#E9E9E9
| 126287 ||  || — || January 9, 2002 || Socorro || LINEAR || — || align=right | 2.6 km || 
|-id=288 bgcolor=#E9E9E9
| 126288 ||  || — || January 9, 2002 || Socorro || LINEAR || — || align=right | 3.0 km || 
|-id=289 bgcolor=#E9E9E9
| 126289 ||  || — || January 9, 2002 || Socorro || LINEAR || — || align=right | 3.8 km || 
|-id=290 bgcolor=#E9E9E9
| 126290 ||  || — || January 9, 2002 || Socorro || LINEAR || — || align=right | 2.1 km || 
|-id=291 bgcolor=#E9E9E9
| 126291 ||  || — || January 9, 2002 || Socorro || LINEAR || — || align=right | 2.5 km || 
|-id=292 bgcolor=#fefefe
| 126292 ||  || — || January 9, 2002 || Socorro || LINEAR || NYS || align=right | 1.4 km || 
|-id=293 bgcolor=#E9E9E9
| 126293 ||  || — || January 9, 2002 || Socorro || LINEAR || — || align=right | 1.7 km || 
|-id=294 bgcolor=#fefefe
| 126294 ||  || — || January 9, 2002 || Socorro || LINEAR || — || align=right | 1.6 km || 
|-id=295 bgcolor=#fefefe
| 126295 ||  || — || January 9, 2002 || Socorro || LINEAR || — || align=right | 1.6 km || 
|-id=296 bgcolor=#fefefe
| 126296 ||  || — || January 9, 2002 || Socorro || LINEAR || MAS || align=right | 1.8 km || 
|-id=297 bgcolor=#E9E9E9
| 126297 ||  || — || January 9, 2002 || Socorro || LINEAR || — || align=right | 2.2 km || 
|-id=298 bgcolor=#fefefe
| 126298 ||  || — || January 9, 2002 || Socorro || LINEAR || — || align=right | 1.7 km || 
|-id=299 bgcolor=#d6d6d6
| 126299 ||  || — || January 9, 2002 || Socorro || LINEAR || — || align=right | 4.2 km || 
|-id=300 bgcolor=#E9E9E9
| 126300 ||  || — || January 9, 2002 || Socorro || LINEAR || — || align=right | 1.9 km || 
|}

126301–126400 

|-bgcolor=#fefefe
| 126301 ||  || — || January 9, 2002 || Socorro || LINEAR || — || align=right | 1.3 km || 
|-id=302 bgcolor=#E9E9E9
| 126302 ||  || — || January 9, 2002 || Socorro || LINEAR || — || align=right | 3.1 km || 
|-id=303 bgcolor=#E9E9E9
| 126303 ||  || — || January 9, 2002 || Socorro || LINEAR || MAR || align=right | 2.1 km || 
|-id=304 bgcolor=#E9E9E9
| 126304 ||  || — || January 9, 2002 || Socorro || LINEAR || EUN || align=right | 2.0 km || 
|-id=305 bgcolor=#E9E9E9
| 126305 ||  || — || January 9, 2002 || Socorro || LINEAR || — || align=right | 4.3 km || 
|-id=306 bgcolor=#d6d6d6
| 126306 ||  || — || January 9, 2002 || Socorro || LINEAR || THM || align=right | 5.1 km || 
|-id=307 bgcolor=#d6d6d6
| 126307 ||  || — || January 9, 2002 || Socorro || LINEAR || — || align=right | 6.8 km || 
|-id=308 bgcolor=#E9E9E9
| 126308 ||  || — || January 9, 2002 || Socorro || LINEAR || — || align=right | 1.9 km || 
|-id=309 bgcolor=#fefefe
| 126309 ||  || — || January 9, 2002 || Socorro || LINEAR || NYS || align=right | 1.2 km || 
|-id=310 bgcolor=#fefefe
| 126310 ||  || — || January 9, 2002 || Socorro || LINEAR || NYS || align=right | 1.5 km || 
|-id=311 bgcolor=#fefefe
| 126311 ||  || — || January 9, 2002 || Socorro || LINEAR || NYS || align=right | 1.3 km || 
|-id=312 bgcolor=#E9E9E9
| 126312 ||  || — || January 11, 2002 || Socorro || LINEAR || — || align=right | 4.9 km || 
|-id=313 bgcolor=#E9E9E9
| 126313 ||  || — || January 11, 2002 || Socorro || LINEAR || ADE || align=right | 4.6 km || 
|-id=314 bgcolor=#E9E9E9
| 126314 ||  || — || January 12, 2002 || Socorro || LINEAR || — || align=right | 1.8 km || 
|-id=315 bgcolor=#E9E9E9
| 126315 Bláthy ||  ||  || January 13, 2002 || Piszkéstető || K. Sárneczky, Z. Heiner || — || align=right | 2.8 km || 
|-id=316 bgcolor=#E9E9E9
| 126316 ||  || — || January 12, 2002 || Palomar || NEAT || HNS || align=right | 2.9 km || 
|-id=317 bgcolor=#fefefe
| 126317 ||  || — || January 9, 2002 || Socorro || LINEAR || V || align=right | 1.1 km || 
|-id=318 bgcolor=#fefefe
| 126318 ||  || — || January 9, 2002 || Socorro || LINEAR || MAS || align=right | 1.7 km || 
|-id=319 bgcolor=#E9E9E9
| 126319 ||  || — || January 9, 2002 || Socorro || LINEAR || AEO || align=right | 2.0 km || 
|-id=320 bgcolor=#fefefe
| 126320 ||  || — || January 13, 2002 || Socorro || LINEAR || — || align=right | 1.5 km || 
|-id=321 bgcolor=#fefefe
| 126321 ||  || — || January 13, 2002 || Socorro || LINEAR || NYS || align=right | 1.3 km || 
|-id=322 bgcolor=#fefefe
| 126322 ||  || — || January 13, 2002 || Socorro || LINEAR || — || align=right | 1.3 km || 
|-id=323 bgcolor=#E9E9E9
| 126323 ||  || — || January 13, 2002 || Socorro || LINEAR || AGN || align=right | 2.1 km || 
|-id=324 bgcolor=#E9E9E9
| 126324 ||  || — || January 13, 2002 || Socorro || LINEAR || — || align=right | 3.3 km || 
|-id=325 bgcolor=#fefefe
| 126325 ||  || — || January 13, 2002 || Socorro || LINEAR || — || align=right | 1.3 km || 
|-id=326 bgcolor=#fefefe
| 126326 ||  || — || January 14, 2002 || Haleakala || NEAT || MAS || align=right | 2.0 km || 
|-id=327 bgcolor=#fefefe
| 126327 ||  || — || January 14, 2002 || Socorro || LINEAR || NYS || align=right | 1.1 km || 
|-id=328 bgcolor=#fefefe
| 126328 ||  || — || January 14, 2002 || Socorro || LINEAR || CLA || align=right | 3.0 km || 
|-id=329 bgcolor=#fefefe
| 126329 ||  || — || January 14, 2002 || Socorro || LINEAR || — || align=right | 1.4 km || 
|-id=330 bgcolor=#E9E9E9
| 126330 ||  || — || January 14, 2002 || Socorro || LINEAR || — || align=right | 1.5 km || 
|-id=331 bgcolor=#E9E9E9
| 126331 ||  || — || January 14, 2002 || Socorro || LINEAR || HEN || align=right | 2.2 km || 
|-id=332 bgcolor=#fefefe
| 126332 ||  || — || January 14, 2002 || Socorro || LINEAR || V || align=right | 1.8 km || 
|-id=333 bgcolor=#E9E9E9
| 126333 ||  || — || January 14, 2002 || Socorro || LINEAR || — || align=right | 2.3 km || 
|-id=334 bgcolor=#E9E9E9
| 126334 ||  || — || January 14, 2002 || Socorro || LINEAR || — || align=right | 1.9 km || 
|-id=335 bgcolor=#fefefe
| 126335 ||  || — || January 14, 2002 || Socorro || LINEAR || NYS || align=right | 1.7 km || 
|-id=336 bgcolor=#E9E9E9
| 126336 ||  || — || January 14, 2002 || Socorro || LINEAR || — || align=right | 1.7 km || 
|-id=337 bgcolor=#E9E9E9
| 126337 ||  || — || January 14, 2002 || Socorro || LINEAR || — || align=right | 4.0 km || 
|-id=338 bgcolor=#E9E9E9
| 126338 ||  || — || January 14, 2002 || Socorro || LINEAR || — || align=right | 1.7 km || 
|-id=339 bgcolor=#fefefe
| 126339 ||  || — || January 14, 2002 || Socorro || LINEAR || MAS || align=right | 2.0 km || 
|-id=340 bgcolor=#E9E9E9
| 126340 ||  || — || January 13, 2002 || Socorro || LINEAR || — || align=right | 3.5 km || 
|-id=341 bgcolor=#fefefe
| 126341 ||  || — || January 13, 2002 || Socorro || LINEAR || NYS || align=right | 1.4 km || 
|-id=342 bgcolor=#fefefe
| 126342 ||  || — || January 13, 2002 || Socorro || LINEAR || — || align=right | 1.6 km || 
|-id=343 bgcolor=#E9E9E9
| 126343 ||  || — || January 13, 2002 || Socorro || LINEAR || — || align=right | 1.2 km || 
|-id=344 bgcolor=#E9E9E9
| 126344 ||  || — || January 13, 2002 || Socorro || LINEAR || — || align=right | 2.1 km || 
|-id=345 bgcolor=#fefefe
| 126345 ||  || — || January 13, 2002 || Socorro || LINEAR || V || align=right | 1.4 km || 
|-id=346 bgcolor=#fefefe
| 126346 ||  || — || January 13, 2002 || Socorro || LINEAR || MAS || align=right | 1.7 km || 
|-id=347 bgcolor=#fefefe
| 126347 ||  || — || January 13, 2002 || Socorro || LINEAR || — || align=right | 1.9 km || 
|-id=348 bgcolor=#E9E9E9
| 126348 ||  || — || January 13, 2002 || Socorro || LINEAR || — || align=right | 3.4 km || 
|-id=349 bgcolor=#d6d6d6
| 126349 ||  || — || January 13, 2002 || Socorro || LINEAR || EOS || align=right | 4.8 km || 
|-id=350 bgcolor=#E9E9E9
| 126350 ||  || — || January 13, 2002 || Socorro || LINEAR || — || align=right | 3.8 km || 
|-id=351 bgcolor=#E9E9E9
| 126351 ||  || — || January 13, 2002 || Socorro || LINEAR || — || align=right | 5.4 km || 
|-id=352 bgcolor=#E9E9E9
| 126352 ||  || — || January 13, 2002 || Socorro || LINEAR || HNS || align=right | 2.8 km || 
|-id=353 bgcolor=#E9E9E9
| 126353 ||  || — || January 14, 2002 || Socorro || LINEAR || — || align=right | 1.7 km || 
|-id=354 bgcolor=#fefefe
| 126354 ||  || — || January 14, 2002 || Socorro || LINEAR || — || align=right | 2.1 km || 
|-id=355 bgcolor=#fefefe
| 126355 ||  || — || January 14, 2002 || Socorro || LINEAR || — || align=right | 3.6 km || 
|-id=356 bgcolor=#fefefe
| 126356 ||  || — || January 14, 2002 || Socorro || LINEAR || NYS || align=right data-sort-value="0.90" | 900 m || 
|-id=357 bgcolor=#E9E9E9
| 126357 ||  || — || January 14, 2002 || Socorro || LINEAR || — || align=right | 2.8 km || 
|-id=358 bgcolor=#E9E9E9
| 126358 ||  || — || January 14, 2002 || Socorro || LINEAR || — || align=right | 1.7 km || 
|-id=359 bgcolor=#fefefe
| 126359 ||  || — || January 14, 2002 || Socorro || LINEAR || — || align=right | 4.3 km || 
|-id=360 bgcolor=#E9E9E9
| 126360 ||  || — || January 14, 2002 || Socorro || LINEAR || — || align=right | 4.7 km || 
|-id=361 bgcolor=#E9E9E9
| 126361 ||  || — || January 14, 2002 || Socorro || LINEAR || MIS || align=right | 3.7 km || 
|-id=362 bgcolor=#E9E9E9
| 126362 ||  || — || January 5, 2002 || Palomar || NEAT || — || align=right | 3.5 km || 
|-id=363 bgcolor=#E9E9E9
| 126363 ||  || — || January 5, 2002 || Palomar || NEAT || — || align=right | 2.9 km || 
|-id=364 bgcolor=#E9E9E9
| 126364 ||  || — || January 5, 2002 || Haleakala || NEAT || — || align=right | 1.9 km || 
|-id=365 bgcolor=#fefefe
| 126365 ||  || — || January 7, 2002 || Anderson Mesa || LONEOS || — || align=right | 2.0 km || 
|-id=366 bgcolor=#E9E9E9
| 126366 ||  || — || January 8, 2002 || Palomar || NEAT || MAR || align=right | 1.9 km || 
|-id=367 bgcolor=#E9E9E9
| 126367 ||  || — || January 8, 2002 || Socorro || LINEAR || — || align=right | 2.7 km || 
|-id=368 bgcolor=#E9E9E9
| 126368 ||  || — || January 8, 2002 || Socorro || LINEAR || — || align=right | 3.0 km || 
|-id=369 bgcolor=#fefefe
| 126369 ||  || — || January 8, 2002 || Socorro || LINEAR || — || align=right | 1.9 km || 
|-id=370 bgcolor=#fefefe
| 126370 ||  || — || January 8, 2002 || Palomar || NEAT || — || align=right | 2.3 km || 
|-id=371 bgcolor=#E9E9E9
| 126371 ||  || — || January 9, 2002 || Socorro || LINEAR || — || align=right | 1.8 km || 
|-id=372 bgcolor=#E9E9E9
| 126372 ||  || — || January 10, 2002 || Palomar || NEAT || — || align=right | 3.7 km || 
|-id=373 bgcolor=#E9E9E9
| 126373 ||  || — || January 11, 2002 || Anderson Mesa || LONEOS || — || align=right | 2.1 km || 
|-id=374 bgcolor=#E9E9E9
| 126374 ||  || — || January 11, 2002 || Socorro || LINEAR || — || align=right | 3.7 km || 
|-id=375 bgcolor=#d6d6d6
| 126375 ||  || — || January 12, 2002 || Palomar || NEAT || — || align=right | 5.2 km || 
|-id=376 bgcolor=#E9E9E9
| 126376 ||  || — || January 12, 2002 || Socorro || LINEAR || — || align=right | 3.2 km || 
|-id=377 bgcolor=#E9E9E9
| 126377 ||  || — || January 12, 2002 || Socorro || LINEAR || — || align=right | 2.3 km || 
|-id=378 bgcolor=#fefefe
| 126378 ||  || — || January 13, 2002 || Socorro || LINEAR || — || align=right | 2.1 km || 
|-id=379 bgcolor=#E9E9E9
| 126379 ||  || — || January 15, 2002 || Haleakala || NEAT || EUN || align=right | 2.6 km || 
|-id=380 bgcolor=#E9E9E9
| 126380 ||  || — || January 8, 2002 || Socorro || LINEAR || — || align=right | 3.9 km || 
|-id=381 bgcolor=#E9E9E9
| 126381 ||  || — || January 9, 2002 || Socorro || LINEAR || — || align=right | 3.6 km || 
|-id=382 bgcolor=#E9E9E9
| 126382 ||  || — || January 13, 2002 || Socorro || LINEAR || — || align=right | 2.6 km || 
|-id=383 bgcolor=#E9E9E9
| 126383 ||  || — || January 13, 2002 || Socorro || LINEAR || — || align=right | 3.7 km || 
|-id=384 bgcolor=#E9E9E9
| 126384 ||  || — || January 8, 2002 || Kitt Peak || Spacewatch || — || align=right | 1.2 km || 
|-id=385 bgcolor=#E9E9E9
| 126385 ||  || — || January 14, 2002 || Kitt Peak || Spacewatch || AGN || align=right | 2.1 km || 
|-id=386 bgcolor=#E9E9E9
| 126386 || 2002 BT || — || January 21, 2002 || Desert Eagle || W. K. Y. Yeung || — || align=right | 4.6 km || 
|-id=387 bgcolor=#E9E9E9
| 126387 || 2002 BZ || — || January 18, 2002 || Socorro || LINEAR || — || align=right | 1.9 km || 
|-id=388 bgcolor=#E9E9E9
| 126388 ||  || — || January 20, 2002 || Desert Eagle || W. K. Y. Yeung || NEM || align=right | 3.3 km || 
|-id=389 bgcolor=#E9E9E9
| 126389 ||  || — || January 21, 2002 || Desert Eagle || W. K. Y. Yeung || — || align=right | 2.1 km || 
|-id=390 bgcolor=#E9E9E9
| 126390 ||  || — || January 21, 2002 || Desert Eagle || W. K. Y. Yeung || — || align=right | 4.0 km || 
|-id=391 bgcolor=#E9E9E9
| 126391 ||  || — || January 18, 2002 || Anderson Mesa || LONEOS || MAR || align=right | 2.2 km || 
|-id=392 bgcolor=#E9E9E9
| 126392 ||  || — || January 18, 2002 || Anderson Mesa || LONEOS || ADE || align=right | 5.5 km || 
|-id=393 bgcolor=#E9E9E9
| 126393 ||  || — || January 18, 2002 || Anderson Mesa || LONEOS || ADE || align=right | 5.6 km || 
|-id=394 bgcolor=#E9E9E9
| 126394 ||  || — || January 20, 2002 || Anderson Mesa || LONEOS || — || align=right | 3.2 km || 
|-id=395 bgcolor=#E9E9E9
| 126395 ||  || — || January 19, 2002 || Anderson Mesa || LONEOS || — || align=right | 3.1 km || 
|-id=396 bgcolor=#E9E9E9
| 126396 ||  || — || January 19, 2002 || Anderson Mesa || LONEOS || EUN || align=right | 3.3 km || 
|-id=397 bgcolor=#E9E9E9
| 126397 ||  || — || January 19, 2002 || Anderson Mesa || LONEOS || — || align=right | 3.3 km || 
|-id=398 bgcolor=#FA8072
| 126398 ||  || — || January 18, 2002 || Socorro || LINEAR || — || align=right | 1.8 km || 
|-id=399 bgcolor=#fefefe
| 126399 ||  || — || January 18, 2002 || Socorro || LINEAR || NYS || align=right | 1.7 km || 
|-id=400 bgcolor=#E9E9E9
| 126400 ||  || — || January 18, 2002 || Socorro || LINEAR || — || align=right | 1.8 km || 
|}

126401–126500 

|-bgcolor=#E9E9E9
| 126401 ||  || — || January 18, 2002 || Socorro || LINEAR || DOR || align=right | 5.2 km || 
|-id=402 bgcolor=#fefefe
| 126402 ||  || — || January 18, 2002 || Socorro || LINEAR || — || align=right | 4.0 km || 
|-id=403 bgcolor=#d6d6d6
| 126403 ||  || — || January 18, 2002 || Socorro || LINEAR || — || align=right | 4.8 km || 
|-id=404 bgcolor=#fefefe
| 126404 ||  || — || January 19, 2002 || Socorro || LINEAR || — || align=right | 1.5 km || 
|-id=405 bgcolor=#d6d6d6
| 126405 ||  || — || January 19, 2002 || Socorro || LINEAR || — || align=right | 4.7 km || 
|-id=406 bgcolor=#E9E9E9
| 126406 ||  || — || January 19, 2002 || Socorro || LINEAR || — || align=right | 2.5 km || 
|-id=407 bgcolor=#E9E9E9
| 126407 ||  || — || January 19, 2002 || Socorro || LINEAR || XIZ || align=right | 2.9 km || 
|-id=408 bgcolor=#fefefe
| 126408 ||  || — || January 19, 2002 || Socorro || LINEAR || — || align=right | 2.0 km || 
|-id=409 bgcolor=#E9E9E9
| 126409 ||  || — || January 21, 2002 || Socorro || LINEAR || — || align=right | 3.1 km || 
|-id=410 bgcolor=#FA8072
| 126410 ||  || — || January 21, 2002 || Socorro || LINEAR || — || align=right | 4.4 km || 
|-id=411 bgcolor=#E9E9E9
| 126411 ||  || — || January 21, 2002 || Socorro || LINEAR || EUN || align=right | 2.5 km || 
|-id=412 bgcolor=#E9E9E9
| 126412 ||  || — || January 21, 2002 || Palomar || NEAT || — || align=right | 1.7 km || 
|-id=413 bgcolor=#fefefe
| 126413 ||  || — || January 22, 2002 || Socorro || LINEAR || NYS || align=right | 1.4 km || 
|-id=414 bgcolor=#fefefe
| 126414 ||  || — || January 22, 2002 || Socorro || LINEAR || MAS || align=right | 1.3 km || 
|-id=415 bgcolor=#E9E9E9
| 126415 ||  || — || January 23, 2002 || Socorro || LINEAR || EUN || align=right | 2.4 km || 
|-id=416 bgcolor=#fefefe
| 126416 ||  || — || January 22, 2002 || Palomar || NEAT || MAS || align=right | 1.8 km || 
|-id=417 bgcolor=#E9E9E9
| 126417 ||  || — || January 20, 2002 || Anderson Mesa || LONEOS || — || align=right | 3.7 km || 
|-id=418 bgcolor=#E9E9E9
| 126418 ||  || — || January 20, 2002 || Anderson Mesa || LONEOS || — || align=right | 2.3 km || 
|-id=419 bgcolor=#E9E9E9
| 126419 ||  || — || January 20, 2002 || Anderson Mesa || LONEOS || — || align=right | 2.4 km || 
|-id=420 bgcolor=#E9E9E9
| 126420 ||  || — || January 20, 2002 || Anderson Mesa || LONEOS || — || align=right | 2.4 km || 
|-id=421 bgcolor=#d6d6d6
| 126421 ||  || — || January 21, 2002 || Palomar || NEAT || — || align=right | 5.4 km || 
|-id=422 bgcolor=#E9E9E9
| 126422 ||  || — || January 21, 2002 || Anderson Mesa || LONEOS || — || align=right | 5.3 km || 
|-id=423 bgcolor=#E9E9E9
| 126423 ||  || — || January 19, 2002 || Socorro || LINEAR || — || align=right | 3.6 km || 
|-id=424 bgcolor=#d6d6d6
| 126424 || 2002 CR || — || February 2, 2002 || Cima Ekar || ADAS || — || align=right | 5.7 km || 
|-id=425 bgcolor=#fefefe
| 126425 ||  || — || February 3, 2002 || Palomar || NEAT || — || align=right | 2.6 km || 
|-id=426 bgcolor=#E9E9E9
| 126426 ||  || — || February 3, 2002 || Palomar || NEAT || — || align=right | 3.1 km || 
|-id=427 bgcolor=#E9E9E9
| 126427 ||  || — || February 3, 2002 || Palomar || NEAT || — || align=right | 4.7 km || 
|-id=428 bgcolor=#E9E9E9
| 126428 ||  || — || February 5, 2002 || Fountain Hills || C. W. Juels, P. R. Holvorcem || MIT || align=right | 4.7 km || 
|-id=429 bgcolor=#fefefe
| 126429 ||  || — || February 3, 2002 || Palomar || NEAT || V || align=right | 1.9 km || 
|-id=430 bgcolor=#fefefe
| 126430 ||  || — || February 4, 2002 || Palomar || NEAT || — || align=right | 1.6 km || 
|-id=431 bgcolor=#fefefe
| 126431 ||  || — || February 4, 2002 || Palomar || NEAT || — || align=right | 2.5 km || 
|-id=432 bgcolor=#d6d6d6
| 126432 ||  || — || February 4, 2002 || Haleakala || NEAT || KOR || align=right | 2.7 km || 
|-id=433 bgcolor=#fefefe
| 126433 ||  || — || February 6, 2002 || Desert Eagle || W. K. Y. Yeung || NYS || align=right | 1.6 km || 
|-id=434 bgcolor=#fefefe
| 126434 ||  || — || February 5, 2002 || Palomar || NEAT || NYS || align=right | 1.4 km || 
|-id=435 bgcolor=#E9E9E9
| 126435 ||  || — || February 6, 2002 || Socorro || LINEAR || HNS || align=right | 2.1 km || 
|-id=436 bgcolor=#fefefe
| 126436 ||  || — || February 6, 2002 || Desert Eagle || W. K. Y. Yeung || NYS || align=right | 3.6 km || 
|-id=437 bgcolor=#E9E9E9
| 126437 ||  || — || February 6, 2002 || Desert Eagle || W. K. Y. Yeung || — || align=right | 1.8 km || 
|-id=438 bgcolor=#fefefe
| 126438 ||  || — || February 6, 2002 || Socorro || LINEAR || — || align=right | 2.6 km || 
|-id=439 bgcolor=#fefefe
| 126439 ||  || — || February 4, 2002 || Črni Vrh || Črni Vrh || NYS || align=right | 1.6 km || 
|-id=440 bgcolor=#E9E9E9
| 126440 ||  || — || February 8, 2002 || Desert Eagle || W. K. Y. Yeung || — || align=right | 4.8 km || 
|-id=441 bgcolor=#fefefe
| 126441 ||  || — || February 8, 2002 || Desert Eagle || W. K. Y. Yeung || NYS || align=right | 1.2 km || 
|-id=442 bgcolor=#d6d6d6
| 126442 ||  || — || February 9, 2002 || Desert Eagle || W. K. Y. Yeung || — || align=right | 4.0 km || 
|-id=443 bgcolor=#fefefe
| 126443 ||  || — || February 8, 2002 || Desert Eagle || W. K. Y. Yeung || NYS || align=right | 3.9 km || 
|-id=444 bgcolor=#fefefe
| 126444 Wylie ||  ||  || February 7, 2002 || Kingsnake || J. V. McClusky || CIM || align=right | 4.2 km || 
|-id=445 bgcolor=#E9E9E9
| 126445 Prestonreeves ||  ||  || February 7, 2002 || Kingsnake || J. V. McClusky || — || align=right | 2.1 km || 
|-id=446 bgcolor=#fefefe
| 126446 ||  || — || February 6, 2002 || Socorro || LINEAR || — || align=right | 1.8 km || 
|-id=447 bgcolor=#d6d6d6
| 126447 ||  || — || February 6, 2002 || Socorro || LINEAR || — || align=right | 3.9 km || 
|-id=448 bgcolor=#E9E9E9
| 126448 ||  || — || February 4, 2002 || Palomar || NEAT || — || align=right | 1.9 km || 
|-id=449 bgcolor=#E9E9E9
| 126449 ||  || — || February 4, 2002 || Palomar || NEAT || — || align=right | 1.9 km || 
|-id=450 bgcolor=#E9E9E9
| 126450 ||  || — || February 4, 2002 || Palomar || NEAT || — || align=right | 4.0 km || 
|-id=451 bgcolor=#d6d6d6
| 126451 ||  || — || February 4, 2002 || Palomar || NEAT || — || align=right | 4.5 km || 
|-id=452 bgcolor=#fefefe
| 126452 ||  || — || February 6, 2002 || Haleakala || NEAT || KLI || align=right | 2.6 km || 
|-id=453 bgcolor=#E9E9E9
| 126453 ||  || — || February 6, 2002 || Haleakala || NEAT || — || align=right | 2.0 km || 
|-id=454 bgcolor=#fefefe
| 126454 ||  || — || February 6, 2002 || Socorro || LINEAR || — || align=right | 3.2 km || 
|-id=455 bgcolor=#fefefe
| 126455 ||  || — || February 6, 2002 || Socorro || LINEAR || — || align=right | 3.5 km || 
|-id=456 bgcolor=#E9E9E9
| 126456 ||  || — || February 6, 2002 || Socorro || LINEAR || — || align=right | 4.8 km || 
|-id=457 bgcolor=#d6d6d6
| 126457 ||  || — || February 6, 2002 || Socorro || LINEAR || CHA || align=right | 3.8 km || 
|-id=458 bgcolor=#fefefe
| 126458 ||  || — || February 6, 2002 || Socorro || LINEAR || — || align=right | 2.3 km || 
|-id=459 bgcolor=#fefefe
| 126459 ||  || — || February 6, 2002 || Socorro || LINEAR || — || align=right | 1.6 km || 
|-id=460 bgcolor=#fefefe
| 126460 ||  || — || February 6, 2002 || Socorro || LINEAR || — || align=right | 1.7 km || 
|-id=461 bgcolor=#E9E9E9
| 126461 ||  || — || February 6, 2002 || Socorro || LINEAR || — || align=right | 2.0 km || 
|-id=462 bgcolor=#E9E9E9
| 126462 ||  || — || February 7, 2002 || Socorro || LINEAR || — || align=right | 1.9 km || 
|-id=463 bgcolor=#E9E9E9
| 126463 ||  || — || February 7, 2002 || Socorro || LINEAR || RAF || align=right | 4.6 km || 
|-id=464 bgcolor=#E9E9E9
| 126464 ||  || — || February 7, 2002 || Socorro || LINEAR || HEN || align=right | 1.8 km || 
|-id=465 bgcolor=#d6d6d6
| 126465 ||  || — || February 7, 2002 || Socorro || LINEAR || KAR || align=right | 2.2 km || 
|-id=466 bgcolor=#fefefe
| 126466 ||  || — || February 7, 2002 || Socorro || LINEAR || NYS || align=right | 1.3 km || 
|-id=467 bgcolor=#E9E9E9
| 126467 ||  || — || February 5, 2002 || Haleakala || NEAT || EUN || align=right | 2.2 km || 
|-id=468 bgcolor=#E9E9E9
| 126468 ||  || — || February 5, 2002 || Haleakala || NEAT || — || align=right | 8.7 km || 
|-id=469 bgcolor=#d6d6d6
| 126469 ||  || — || February 7, 2002 || Palomar || NEAT || — || align=right | 8.9 km || 
|-id=470 bgcolor=#E9E9E9
| 126470 ||  || — || February 7, 2002 || Palomar || NEAT || JUN || align=right | 1.4 km || 
|-id=471 bgcolor=#E9E9E9
| 126471 ||  || — || February 7, 2002 || Haleakala || NEAT || JUN || align=right | 1.7 km || 
|-id=472 bgcolor=#E9E9E9
| 126472 ||  || — || February 7, 2002 || Palomar || NEAT || — || align=right | 3.5 km || 
|-id=473 bgcolor=#E9E9E9
| 126473 ||  || — || February 12, 2002 || Fountain Hills || C. W. Juels, P. R. Holvorcem || — || align=right | 4.4 km || 
|-id=474 bgcolor=#d6d6d6
| 126474 ||  || — || February 11, 2002 || Desert Eagle || W. K. Y. Yeung || THM || align=right | 7.3 km || 
|-id=475 bgcolor=#E9E9E9
| 126475 ||  || — || February 8, 2002 || Kitt Peak || Spacewatch || — || align=right | 1.7 km || 
|-id=476 bgcolor=#d6d6d6
| 126476 ||  || — || February 3, 2002 || Haleakala || NEAT || — || align=right | 5.6 km || 
|-id=477 bgcolor=#E9E9E9
| 126477 ||  || — || February 3, 2002 || Haleakala || NEAT || — || align=right | 2.0 km || 
|-id=478 bgcolor=#E9E9E9
| 126478 ||  || — || February 3, 2002 || Haleakala || NEAT || ADE || align=right | 5.6 km || 
|-id=479 bgcolor=#E9E9E9
| 126479 ||  || — || February 3, 2002 || Haleakala || NEAT || EUN || align=right | 2.7 km || 
|-id=480 bgcolor=#d6d6d6
| 126480 ||  || — || February 3, 2002 || Haleakala || NEAT || KOR || align=right | 2.4 km || 
|-id=481 bgcolor=#d6d6d6
| 126481 ||  || — || February 3, 2002 || Haleakala || NEAT || — || align=right | 5.4 km || 
|-id=482 bgcolor=#fefefe
| 126482 ||  || — || February 12, 2002 || Desert Eagle || W. K. Y. Yeung || — || align=right | 2.4 km || 
|-id=483 bgcolor=#E9E9E9
| 126483 ||  || — || February 12, 2002 || Desert Eagle || W. K. Y. Yeung || — || align=right | 2.6 km || 
|-id=484 bgcolor=#E9E9E9
| 126484 ||  || — || February 12, 2002 || Desert Eagle || W. K. Y. Yeung || — || align=right | 2.5 km || 
|-id=485 bgcolor=#d6d6d6
| 126485 ||  || — || February 7, 2002 || Socorro || LINEAR || — || align=right | 4.1 km || 
|-id=486 bgcolor=#fefefe
| 126486 ||  || — || February 7, 2002 || Socorro || LINEAR || NYS || align=right | 1.5 km || 
|-id=487 bgcolor=#fefefe
| 126487 ||  || — || February 7, 2002 || Socorro || LINEAR || NYS || align=right | 1.2 km || 
|-id=488 bgcolor=#E9E9E9
| 126488 ||  || — || February 7, 2002 || Socorro || LINEAR || — || align=right | 2.1 km || 
|-id=489 bgcolor=#fefefe
| 126489 ||  || — || February 7, 2002 || Socorro || LINEAR || NYS || align=right | 1.5 km || 
|-id=490 bgcolor=#E9E9E9
| 126490 ||  || — || February 7, 2002 || Socorro || LINEAR || MAR || align=right | 2.1 km || 
|-id=491 bgcolor=#E9E9E9
| 126491 ||  || — || February 7, 2002 || Socorro || LINEAR || — || align=right | 2.1 km || 
|-id=492 bgcolor=#E9E9E9
| 126492 ||  || — || February 7, 2002 || Socorro || LINEAR || — || align=right | 6.8 km || 
|-id=493 bgcolor=#fefefe
| 126493 ||  || — || February 7, 2002 || Socorro || LINEAR || NYS || align=right | 1.9 km || 
|-id=494 bgcolor=#E9E9E9
| 126494 ||  || — || February 7, 2002 || Socorro || LINEAR || — || align=right | 4.3 km || 
|-id=495 bgcolor=#d6d6d6
| 126495 ||  || — || February 7, 2002 || Socorro || LINEAR || KOR || align=right | 2.9 km || 
|-id=496 bgcolor=#E9E9E9
| 126496 ||  || — || February 12, 2002 || Desert Eagle || W. K. Y. Yeung || — || align=right | 2.8 km || 
|-id=497 bgcolor=#E9E9E9
| 126497 ||  || — || February 13, 2002 || Desert Eagle || W. K. Y. Yeung || — || align=right | 2.6 km || 
|-id=498 bgcolor=#E9E9E9
| 126498 ||  || — || February 6, 2002 || Socorro || LINEAR || MAR || align=right | 2.3 km || 
|-id=499 bgcolor=#d6d6d6
| 126499 ||  || — || February 6, 2002 || Socorro || LINEAR || — || align=right | 4.8 km || 
|-id=500 bgcolor=#fefefe
| 126500 ||  || — || February 6, 2002 || Socorro || LINEAR || — || align=right | 1.9 km || 
|}

126501–126600 

|-bgcolor=#E9E9E9
| 126501 ||  || — || February 6, 2002 || Socorro || LINEAR || — || align=right | 3.6 km || 
|-id=502 bgcolor=#E9E9E9
| 126502 ||  || — || February 6, 2002 || Socorro || LINEAR || — || align=right | 2.0 km || 
|-id=503 bgcolor=#fefefe
| 126503 ||  || — || February 6, 2002 || Socorro || LINEAR || V || align=right | 1.6 km || 
|-id=504 bgcolor=#d6d6d6
| 126504 ||  || — || February 6, 2002 || Socorro || LINEAR || — || align=right | 3.6 km || 
|-id=505 bgcolor=#E9E9E9
| 126505 ||  || — || February 6, 2002 || Socorro || LINEAR || EUN || align=right | 3.0 km || 
|-id=506 bgcolor=#E9E9E9
| 126506 ||  || — || February 6, 2002 || Socorro || LINEAR || — || align=right | 3.0 km || 
|-id=507 bgcolor=#E9E9E9
| 126507 ||  || — || February 6, 2002 || Socorro || LINEAR || — || align=right | 3.1 km || 
|-id=508 bgcolor=#E9E9E9
| 126508 ||  || — || February 7, 2002 || Socorro || LINEAR || — || align=right | 3.9 km || 
|-id=509 bgcolor=#fefefe
| 126509 ||  || — || February 7, 2002 || Socorro || LINEAR || — || align=right | 1.4 km || 
|-id=510 bgcolor=#fefefe
| 126510 ||  || — || February 7, 2002 || Socorro || LINEAR || NYS || align=right | 1.3 km || 
|-id=511 bgcolor=#fefefe
| 126511 ||  || — || February 7, 2002 || Socorro || LINEAR || — || align=right | 1.5 km || 
|-id=512 bgcolor=#E9E9E9
| 126512 ||  || — || February 7, 2002 || Socorro || LINEAR || — || align=right | 2.2 km || 
|-id=513 bgcolor=#E9E9E9
| 126513 ||  || — || February 7, 2002 || Socorro || LINEAR || HEN || align=right | 2.1 km || 
|-id=514 bgcolor=#d6d6d6
| 126514 ||  || — || February 7, 2002 || Socorro || LINEAR || — || align=right | 6.6 km || 
|-id=515 bgcolor=#fefefe
| 126515 ||  || — || February 7, 2002 || Socorro || LINEAR || — || align=right | 2.8 km || 
|-id=516 bgcolor=#E9E9E9
| 126516 ||  || — || February 7, 2002 || Socorro || LINEAR || — || align=right | 2.6 km || 
|-id=517 bgcolor=#d6d6d6
| 126517 ||  || — || February 7, 2002 || Socorro || LINEAR || KOR || align=right | 3.0 km || 
|-id=518 bgcolor=#E9E9E9
| 126518 ||  || — || February 7, 2002 || Socorro || LINEAR || — || align=right | 2.1 km || 
|-id=519 bgcolor=#E9E9E9
| 126519 ||  || — || February 7, 2002 || Socorro || LINEAR || — || align=right | 2.3 km || 
|-id=520 bgcolor=#E9E9E9
| 126520 ||  || — || February 7, 2002 || Socorro || LINEAR || — || align=right | 2.5 km || 
|-id=521 bgcolor=#d6d6d6
| 126521 ||  || — || February 7, 2002 || Socorro || LINEAR || EOS || align=right | 3.6 km || 
|-id=522 bgcolor=#E9E9E9
| 126522 ||  || — || February 7, 2002 || Socorro || LINEAR || — || align=right | 1.5 km || 
|-id=523 bgcolor=#E9E9E9
| 126523 ||  || — || February 7, 2002 || Socorro || LINEAR || — || align=right | 1.6 km || 
|-id=524 bgcolor=#E9E9E9
| 126524 ||  || — || February 7, 2002 || Socorro || LINEAR || — || align=right | 1.8 km || 
|-id=525 bgcolor=#d6d6d6
| 126525 ||  || — || February 7, 2002 || Socorro || LINEAR || — || align=right | 4.1 km || 
|-id=526 bgcolor=#E9E9E9
| 126526 ||  || — || February 7, 2002 || Socorro || LINEAR || — || align=right | 1.8 km || 
|-id=527 bgcolor=#fefefe
| 126527 ||  || — || February 7, 2002 || Socorro || LINEAR || NYS || align=right | 1.3 km || 
|-id=528 bgcolor=#E9E9E9
| 126528 ||  || — || February 7, 2002 || Socorro || LINEAR || — || align=right | 3.3 km || 
|-id=529 bgcolor=#E9E9E9
| 126529 ||  || — || February 7, 2002 || Socorro || LINEAR || — || align=right | 1.6 km || 
|-id=530 bgcolor=#E9E9E9
| 126530 ||  || — || February 7, 2002 || Socorro || LINEAR || — || align=right | 3.2 km || 
|-id=531 bgcolor=#E9E9E9
| 126531 ||  || — || February 7, 2002 || Socorro || LINEAR || — || align=right | 2.1 km || 
|-id=532 bgcolor=#E9E9E9
| 126532 ||  || — || February 7, 2002 || Socorro || LINEAR || AGN || align=right | 1.8 km || 
|-id=533 bgcolor=#d6d6d6
| 126533 ||  || — || February 7, 2002 || Socorro || LINEAR || — || align=right | 2.8 km || 
|-id=534 bgcolor=#E9E9E9
| 126534 ||  || — || February 7, 2002 || Socorro || LINEAR || — || align=right | 1.6 km || 
|-id=535 bgcolor=#E9E9E9
| 126535 ||  || — || February 7, 2002 || Socorro || LINEAR || — || align=right | 2.7 km || 
|-id=536 bgcolor=#fefefe
| 126536 ||  || — || February 7, 2002 || Socorro || LINEAR || NYS || align=right | 1.5 km || 
|-id=537 bgcolor=#E9E9E9
| 126537 ||  || — || February 7, 2002 || Socorro || LINEAR || — || align=right | 2.5 km || 
|-id=538 bgcolor=#d6d6d6
| 126538 ||  || — || February 7, 2002 || Socorro || LINEAR || — || align=right | 6.6 km || 
|-id=539 bgcolor=#fefefe
| 126539 ||  || — || February 7, 2002 || Socorro || LINEAR || — || align=right | 1.7 km || 
|-id=540 bgcolor=#E9E9E9
| 126540 ||  || — || February 7, 2002 || Socorro || LINEAR || — || align=right | 2.1 km || 
|-id=541 bgcolor=#E9E9E9
| 126541 ||  || — || February 7, 2002 || Socorro || LINEAR || — || align=right | 5.3 km || 
|-id=542 bgcolor=#E9E9E9
| 126542 ||  || — || February 7, 2002 || Socorro || LINEAR || HEN || align=right | 2.1 km || 
|-id=543 bgcolor=#fefefe
| 126543 ||  || — || February 7, 2002 || Socorro || LINEAR || NYS || align=right | 1.6 km || 
|-id=544 bgcolor=#fefefe
| 126544 ||  || — || February 7, 2002 || Socorro || LINEAR || NYS || align=right | 1.2 km || 
|-id=545 bgcolor=#E9E9E9
| 126545 ||  || — || February 7, 2002 || Socorro || LINEAR || — || align=right | 1.7 km || 
|-id=546 bgcolor=#fefefe
| 126546 ||  || — || February 7, 2002 || Socorro || LINEAR || — || align=right | 3.1 km || 
|-id=547 bgcolor=#d6d6d6
| 126547 ||  || — || February 7, 2002 || Socorro || LINEAR || — || align=right | 5.0 km || 
|-id=548 bgcolor=#d6d6d6
| 126548 ||  || — || February 7, 2002 || Socorro || LINEAR || — || align=right | 4.9 km || 
|-id=549 bgcolor=#fefefe
| 126549 ||  || — || February 7, 2002 || Socorro || LINEAR || MAS || align=right | 1.7 km || 
|-id=550 bgcolor=#d6d6d6
| 126550 ||  || — || February 7, 2002 || Socorro || LINEAR || — || align=right | 5.6 km || 
|-id=551 bgcolor=#E9E9E9
| 126551 ||  || — || February 7, 2002 || Socorro || LINEAR || HEN || align=right | 1.9 km || 
|-id=552 bgcolor=#E9E9E9
| 126552 ||  || — || February 7, 2002 || Socorro || LINEAR || — || align=right | 2.9 km || 
|-id=553 bgcolor=#E9E9E9
| 126553 ||  || — || February 7, 2002 || Socorro || LINEAR || — || align=right | 2.7 km || 
|-id=554 bgcolor=#E9E9E9
| 126554 ||  || — || February 7, 2002 || Socorro || LINEAR || — || align=right | 5.0 km || 
|-id=555 bgcolor=#fefefe
| 126555 ||  || — || February 7, 2002 || Socorro || LINEAR || NYS || align=right | 1.9 km || 
|-id=556 bgcolor=#d6d6d6
| 126556 ||  || — || February 7, 2002 || Socorro || LINEAR || KOR || align=right | 2.6 km || 
|-id=557 bgcolor=#E9E9E9
| 126557 ||  || — || February 7, 2002 || Socorro || LINEAR || XIZ || align=right | 2.7 km || 
|-id=558 bgcolor=#d6d6d6
| 126558 ||  || — || February 7, 2002 || Socorro || LINEAR || — || align=right | 4.8 km || 
|-id=559 bgcolor=#d6d6d6
| 126559 ||  || — || February 7, 2002 || Socorro || LINEAR || THM || align=right | 4.4 km || 
|-id=560 bgcolor=#E9E9E9
| 126560 ||  || — || February 7, 2002 || Socorro || LINEAR || — || align=right | 3.0 km || 
|-id=561 bgcolor=#d6d6d6
| 126561 ||  || — || February 7, 2002 || Socorro || LINEAR || THM || align=right | 7.0 km || 
|-id=562 bgcolor=#E9E9E9
| 126562 ||  || — || February 7, 2002 || Socorro || LINEAR || EUN || align=right | 2.1 km || 
|-id=563 bgcolor=#E9E9E9
| 126563 ||  || — || February 7, 2002 || Socorro || LINEAR || — || align=right | 4.6 km || 
|-id=564 bgcolor=#E9E9E9
| 126564 ||  || — || February 7, 2002 || Socorro || LINEAR || — || align=right | 3.1 km || 
|-id=565 bgcolor=#d6d6d6
| 126565 ||  || — || February 7, 2002 || Socorro || LINEAR || — || align=right | 5.2 km || 
|-id=566 bgcolor=#d6d6d6
| 126566 ||  || — || February 7, 2002 || Socorro || LINEAR || — || align=right | 3.6 km || 
|-id=567 bgcolor=#fefefe
| 126567 ||  || — || February 7, 2002 || Socorro || LINEAR || NYS || align=right | 1.2 km || 
|-id=568 bgcolor=#E9E9E9
| 126568 ||  || — || February 7, 2002 || Socorro || LINEAR || — || align=right | 5.4 km || 
|-id=569 bgcolor=#E9E9E9
| 126569 ||  || — || February 7, 2002 || Socorro || LINEAR || HNS || align=right | 1.9 km || 
|-id=570 bgcolor=#E9E9E9
| 126570 ||  || — || February 7, 2002 || Socorro || LINEAR || — || align=right | 1.6 km || 
|-id=571 bgcolor=#d6d6d6
| 126571 ||  || — || February 7, 2002 || Socorro || LINEAR || THM || align=right | 4.5 km || 
|-id=572 bgcolor=#d6d6d6
| 126572 ||  || — || February 7, 2002 || Socorro || LINEAR || EOS || align=right | 3.3 km || 
|-id=573 bgcolor=#d6d6d6
| 126573 ||  || — || February 7, 2002 || Socorro || LINEAR || — || align=right | 4.5 km || 
|-id=574 bgcolor=#E9E9E9
| 126574 ||  || — || February 7, 2002 || Socorro || LINEAR || — || align=right | 3.4 km || 
|-id=575 bgcolor=#E9E9E9
| 126575 ||  || — || February 8, 2002 || Socorro || LINEAR || — || align=right | 2.7 km || 
|-id=576 bgcolor=#E9E9E9
| 126576 ||  || — || February 8, 2002 || Socorro || LINEAR || RAF || align=right | 1.7 km || 
|-id=577 bgcolor=#E9E9E9
| 126577 ||  || — || February 8, 2002 || Socorro || LINEAR || MAR || align=right | 2.6 km || 
|-id=578 bgcolor=#d6d6d6
| 126578 Suhhosoo ||  ||  || February 11, 2002 || Bohyunsan || Y.-B. Jeon || KOR || align=right | 2.7 km || 
|-id=579 bgcolor=#E9E9E9
| 126579 ||  || — || February 7, 2002 || Socorro || LINEAR || — || align=right | 4.0 km || 
|-id=580 bgcolor=#fefefe
| 126580 ||  || — || February 7, 2002 || Socorro || LINEAR || MAS || align=right | 1.5 km || 
|-id=581 bgcolor=#fefefe
| 126581 ||  || — || February 7, 2002 || Socorro || LINEAR || — || align=right | 1.7 km || 
|-id=582 bgcolor=#fefefe
| 126582 ||  || — || February 7, 2002 || Socorro || LINEAR || — || align=right | 2.4 km || 
|-id=583 bgcolor=#fefefe
| 126583 ||  || — || February 7, 2002 || Socorro || LINEAR || MAS || align=right | 1.3 km || 
|-id=584 bgcolor=#d6d6d6
| 126584 ||  || — || February 7, 2002 || Socorro || LINEAR || — || align=right | 5.0 km || 
|-id=585 bgcolor=#E9E9E9
| 126585 ||  || — || February 7, 2002 || Socorro || LINEAR || — || align=right | 2.1 km || 
|-id=586 bgcolor=#fefefe
| 126586 ||  || — || February 7, 2002 || Socorro || LINEAR || NYS || align=right | 2.8 km || 
|-id=587 bgcolor=#E9E9E9
| 126587 ||  || — || February 7, 2002 || Socorro || LINEAR || HEN || align=right | 2.0 km || 
|-id=588 bgcolor=#fefefe
| 126588 ||  || — || February 7, 2002 || Socorro || LINEAR || MAS || align=right | 1.2 km || 
|-id=589 bgcolor=#E9E9E9
| 126589 ||  || — || February 7, 2002 || Socorro || LINEAR || — || align=right | 2.1 km || 
|-id=590 bgcolor=#fefefe
| 126590 ||  || — || February 7, 2002 || Socorro || LINEAR || — || align=right | 1.3 km || 
|-id=591 bgcolor=#fefefe
| 126591 ||  || — || February 7, 2002 || Socorro || LINEAR || — || align=right | 2.7 km || 
|-id=592 bgcolor=#d6d6d6
| 126592 ||  || — || February 7, 2002 || Socorro || LINEAR || — || align=right | 4.2 km || 
|-id=593 bgcolor=#fefefe
| 126593 ||  || — || February 7, 2002 || Socorro || LINEAR || V || align=right | 1.1 km || 
|-id=594 bgcolor=#E9E9E9
| 126594 ||  || — || February 7, 2002 || Socorro || LINEAR || — || align=right | 2.4 km || 
|-id=595 bgcolor=#E9E9E9
| 126595 ||  || — || February 7, 2002 || Socorro || LINEAR || — || align=right | 3.3 km || 
|-id=596 bgcolor=#E9E9E9
| 126596 ||  || — || February 7, 2002 || Socorro || LINEAR || HOF || align=right | 5.0 km || 
|-id=597 bgcolor=#E9E9E9
| 126597 ||  || — || February 7, 2002 || Socorro || LINEAR || — || align=right | 1.8 km || 
|-id=598 bgcolor=#E9E9E9
| 126598 ||  || — || February 7, 2002 || Socorro || LINEAR || — || align=right | 2.7 km || 
|-id=599 bgcolor=#E9E9E9
| 126599 ||  || — || February 7, 2002 || Socorro || LINEAR || — || align=right | 3.4 km || 
|-id=600 bgcolor=#fefefe
| 126600 ||  || — || February 8, 2002 || Socorro || LINEAR || — || align=right | 3.5 km || 
|}

126601–126700 

|-bgcolor=#fefefe
| 126601 ||  || — || February 8, 2002 || Socorro || LINEAR || V || align=right | 1.4 km || 
|-id=602 bgcolor=#fefefe
| 126602 ||  || — || February 8, 2002 || Socorro || LINEAR || — || align=right | 2.5 km || 
|-id=603 bgcolor=#fefefe
| 126603 ||  || — || February 8, 2002 || Socorro || LINEAR || FLO || align=right | 1.3 km || 
|-id=604 bgcolor=#E9E9E9
| 126604 ||  || — || February 8, 2002 || Socorro || LINEAR || — || align=right | 5.1 km || 
|-id=605 bgcolor=#E9E9E9
| 126605 ||  || — || February 8, 2002 || Socorro || LINEAR || MRX || align=right | 1.9 km || 
|-id=606 bgcolor=#E9E9E9
| 126606 ||  || — || February 8, 2002 || Socorro || LINEAR || — || align=right | 5.2 km || 
|-id=607 bgcolor=#E9E9E9
| 126607 ||  || — || February 9, 2002 || Socorro || LINEAR || HOF || align=right | 4.1 km || 
|-id=608 bgcolor=#fefefe
| 126608 ||  || — || February 9, 2002 || Socorro || LINEAR || — || align=right | 1.8 km || 
|-id=609 bgcolor=#E9E9E9
| 126609 ||  || — || February 9, 2002 || Socorro || LINEAR || — || align=right | 1.8 km || 
|-id=610 bgcolor=#E9E9E9
| 126610 ||  || — || February 9, 2002 || Socorro || LINEAR || — || align=right | 2.4 km || 
|-id=611 bgcolor=#E9E9E9
| 126611 ||  || — || February 9, 2002 || Socorro || LINEAR || — || align=right | 1.6 km || 
|-id=612 bgcolor=#E9E9E9
| 126612 ||  || — || February 9, 2002 || Socorro || LINEAR || — || align=right | 3.7 km || 
|-id=613 bgcolor=#fefefe
| 126613 ||  || — || February 10, 2002 || Socorro || LINEAR || — || align=right | 1.3 km || 
|-id=614 bgcolor=#E9E9E9
| 126614 ||  || — || February 10, 2002 || Socorro || LINEAR || AGN || align=right | 2.2 km || 
|-id=615 bgcolor=#fefefe
| 126615 ||  || — || February 10, 2002 || Socorro || LINEAR || ERI || align=right | 2.3 km || 
|-id=616 bgcolor=#E9E9E9
| 126616 ||  || — || February 10, 2002 || Socorro || LINEAR || — || align=right | 3.5 km || 
|-id=617 bgcolor=#d6d6d6
| 126617 ||  || — || February 10, 2002 || Socorro || LINEAR || — || align=right | 4.9 km || 
|-id=618 bgcolor=#E9E9E9
| 126618 ||  || — || February 9, 2002 || Kitt Peak || Spacewatch || — || align=right | 3.7 km || 
|-id=619 bgcolor=#C2E0FF
| 126619 ||  || — || February 6, 2002 || Kitt Peak || M. W. Buie || SDO || align=right | 161 km || 
|-id=620 bgcolor=#E9E9E9
| 126620 ||  || — || February 6, 2002 || Socorro || LINEAR || EUN || align=right | 3.1 km || 
|-id=621 bgcolor=#d6d6d6
| 126621 ||  || — || February 7, 2002 || Socorro || LINEAR || — || align=right | 4.7 km || 
|-id=622 bgcolor=#fefefe
| 126622 ||  || — || February 7, 2002 || Socorro || LINEAR || NYS || align=right | 1.2 km || 
|-id=623 bgcolor=#E9E9E9
| 126623 ||  || — || February 8, 2002 || Socorro || LINEAR || — || align=right | 2.7 km || 
|-id=624 bgcolor=#E9E9E9
| 126624 ||  || — || February 8, 2002 || Socorro || LINEAR || — || align=right | 2.3 km || 
|-id=625 bgcolor=#E9E9E9
| 126625 ||  || — || February 8, 2002 || Socorro || LINEAR || — || align=right | 2.3 km || 
|-id=626 bgcolor=#E9E9E9
| 126626 ||  || — || February 8, 2002 || Socorro || LINEAR || — || align=right | 1.6 km || 
|-id=627 bgcolor=#E9E9E9
| 126627 ||  || — || February 8, 2002 || Socorro || LINEAR || — || align=right | 2.1 km || 
|-id=628 bgcolor=#E9E9E9
| 126628 ||  || — || February 8, 2002 || Socorro || LINEAR || — || align=right | 3.5 km || 
|-id=629 bgcolor=#fefefe
| 126629 ||  || — || February 8, 2002 || Socorro || LINEAR || — || align=right | 1.4 km || 
|-id=630 bgcolor=#E9E9E9
| 126630 ||  || — || February 8, 2002 || Socorro || LINEAR || AGN || align=right | 2.2 km || 
|-id=631 bgcolor=#E9E9E9
| 126631 ||  || — || February 8, 2002 || Socorro || LINEAR || — || align=right | 3.9 km || 
|-id=632 bgcolor=#E9E9E9
| 126632 ||  || — || February 8, 2002 || Socorro || LINEAR || — || align=right | 1.3 km || 
|-id=633 bgcolor=#d6d6d6
| 126633 ||  || — || February 8, 2002 || Socorro || LINEAR || — || align=right | 5.5 km || 
|-id=634 bgcolor=#E9E9E9
| 126634 ||  || — || February 8, 2002 || Socorro || LINEAR || MIT || align=right | 2.6 km || 
|-id=635 bgcolor=#fefefe
| 126635 ||  || — || February 8, 2002 || Socorro || LINEAR || — || align=right | 1.7 km || 
|-id=636 bgcolor=#E9E9E9
| 126636 ||  || — || February 8, 2002 || Socorro || LINEAR || — || align=right | 2.3 km || 
|-id=637 bgcolor=#E9E9E9
| 126637 ||  || — || February 8, 2002 || Socorro || LINEAR || — || align=right | 2.0 km || 
|-id=638 bgcolor=#E9E9E9
| 126638 ||  || — || February 8, 2002 || Socorro || LINEAR || EUN || align=right | 2.1 km || 
|-id=639 bgcolor=#E9E9E9
| 126639 ||  || — || February 8, 2002 || Socorro || LINEAR || — || align=right | 3.8 km || 
|-id=640 bgcolor=#E9E9E9
| 126640 ||  || — || February 8, 2002 || Socorro || LINEAR || EUN || align=right | 2.3 km || 
|-id=641 bgcolor=#d6d6d6
| 126641 ||  || — || February 8, 2002 || Socorro || LINEAR || — || align=right | 7.5 km || 
|-id=642 bgcolor=#fefefe
| 126642 ||  || — || February 10, 2002 || Socorro || LINEAR || NYS || align=right | 3.5 km || 
|-id=643 bgcolor=#fefefe
| 126643 ||  || — || February 10, 2002 || Socorro || LINEAR || NYS || align=right | 2.3 km || 
|-id=644 bgcolor=#d6d6d6
| 126644 ||  || — || February 10, 2002 || Socorro || LINEAR || — || align=right | 5.0 km || 
|-id=645 bgcolor=#fefefe
| 126645 ||  || — || February 10, 2002 || Socorro || LINEAR || NYS || align=right | 2.6 km || 
|-id=646 bgcolor=#E9E9E9
| 126646 ||  || — || February 10, 2002 || Socorro || LINEAR || — || align=right | 2.7 km || 
|-id=647 bgcolor=#d6d6d6
| 126647 ||  || — || February 10, 2002 || Socorro || LINEAR || KOR || align=right | 1.9 km || 
|-id=648 bgcolor=#d6d6d6
| 126648 ||  || — || February 10, 2002 || Socorro || LINEAR || — || align=right | 4.9 km || 
|-id=649 bgcolor=#d6d6d6
| 126649 ||  || — || February 10, 2002 || Socorro || LINEAR || HYG || align=right | 5.8 km || 
|-id=650 bgcolor=#d6d6d6
| 126650 ||  || — || February 10, 2002 || Socorro || LINEAR || KOR || align=right | 2.5 km || 
|-id=651 bgcolor=#d6d6d6
| 126651 ||  || — || February 10, 2002 || Socorro || LINEAR || KOR || align=right | 2.8 km || 
|-id=652 bgcolor=#E9E9E9
| 126652 ||  || — || February 10, 2002 || Socorro || LINEAR || — || align=right | 2.3 km || 
|-id=653 bgcolor=#E9E9E9
| 126653 ||  || — || February 10, 2002 || Socorro || LINEAR || AER || align=right | 2.4 km || 
|-id=654 bgcolor=#fefefe
| 126654 ||  || — || February 10, 2002 || Socorro || LINEAR || — || align=right | 2.6 km || 
|-id=655 bgcolor=#E9E9E9
| 126655 ||  || — || February 10, 2002 || Socorro || LINEAR || — || align=right | 4.7 km || 
|-id=656 bgcolor=#E9E9E9
| 126656 ||  || — || February 10, 2002 || Socorro || LINEAR || — || align=right | 1.4 km || 
|-id=657 bgcolor=#E9E9E9
| 126657 ||  || — || February 10, 2002 || Socorro || LINEAR || — || align=right | 2.2 km || 
|-id=658 bgcolor=#d6d6d6
| 126658 ||  || — || February 10, 2002 || Socorro || LINEAR || — || align=right | 5.1 km || 
|-id=659 bgcolor=#E9E9E9
| 126659 ||  || — || February 10, 2002 || Socorro || LINEAR || — || align=right | 1.8 km || 
|-id=660 bgcolor=#d6d6d6
| 126660 ||  || — || February 10, 2002 || Socorro || LINEAR || — || align=right | 4.5 km || 
|-id=661 bgcolor=#E9E9E9
| 126661 ||  || — || February 10, 2002 || Socorro || LINEAR || — || align=right | 3.2 km || 
|-id=662 bgcolor=#d6d6d6
| 126662 ||  || — || February 10, 2002 || Socorro || LINEAR || — || align=right | 4.1 km || 
|-id=663 bgcolor=#E9E9E9
| 126663 ||  || — || February 10, 2002 || Socorro || LINEAR || — || align=right | 2.5 km || 
|-id=664 bgcolor=#d6d6d6
| 126664 ||  || — || February 10, 2002 || Socorro || LINEAR || — || align=right | 5.0 km || 
|-id=665 bgcolor=#E9E9E9
| 126665 ||  || — || February 10, 2002 || Socorro || LINEAR || — || align=right | 2.7 km || 
|-id=666 bgcolor=#d6d6d6
| 126666 ||  || — || February 10, 2002 || Socorro || LINEAR || KOR || align=right | 2.1 km || 
|-id=667 bgcolor=#E9E9E9
| 126667 ||  || — || February 10, 2002 || Socorro || LINEAR || AGN || align=right | 2.1 km || 
|-id=668 bgcolor=#d6d6d6
| 126668 ||  || — || February 10, 2002 || Socorro || LINEAR || — || align=right | 3.9 km || 
|-id=669 bgcolor=#d6d6d6
| 126669 ||  || — || February 10, 2002 || Socorro || LINEAR || THM || align=right | 5.6 km || 
|-id=670 bgcolor=#fefefe
| 126670 ||  || — || February 10, 2002 || Socorro || LINEAR || — || align=right | 2.0 km || 
|-id=671 bgcolor=#E9E9E9
| 126671 ||  || — || February 10, 2002 || Socorro || LINEAR || — || align=right | 1.5 km || 
|-id=672 bgcolor=#E9E9E9
| 126672 ||  || — || February 10, 2002 || Socorro || LINEAR || fast? || align=right | 1.6 km || 
|-id=673 bgcolor=#d6d6d6
| 126673 ||  || — || February 10, 2002 || Socorro || LINEAR || — || align=right | 4.8 km || 
|-id=674 bgcolor=#d6d6d6
| 126674 ||  || — || February 10, 2002 || Socorro || LINEAR || — || align=right | 4.3 km || 
|-id=675 bgcolor=#d6d6d6
| 126675 ||  || — || February 10, 2002 || Socorro || LINEAR || THM || align=right | 6.7 km || 
|-id=676 bgcolor=#d6d6d6
| 126676 ||  || — || February 10, 2002 || Socorro || LINEAR || THM || align=right | 5.3 km || 
|-id=677 bgcolor=#d6d6d6
| 126677 ||  || — || February 10, 2002 || Socorro || LINEAR || KOR || align=right | 3.0 km || 
|-id=678 bgcolor=#d6d6d6
| 126678 ||  || — || February 10, 2002 || Socorro || LINEAR || KOR || align=right | 2.5 km || 
|-id=679 bgcolor=#d6d6d6
| 126679 ||  || — || February 10, 2002 || Socorro || LINEAR || KOR || align=right | 3.3 km || 
|-id=680 bgcolor=#E9E9E9
| 126680 ||  || — || February 10, 2002 || Socorro || LINEAR || — || align=right | 1.9 km || 
|-id=681 bgcolor=#d6d6d6
| 126681 ||  || — || February 10, 2002 || Socorro || LINEAR || — || align=right | 4.8 km || 
|-id=682 bgcolor=#d6d6d6
| 126682 ||  || — || February 10, 2002 || Socorro || LINEAR || — || align=right | 4.9 km || 
|-id=683 bgcolor=#E9E9E9
| 126683 ||  || — || February 10, 2002 || Socorro || LINEAR || — || align=right | 2.5 km || 
|-id=684 bgcolor=#fefefe
| 126684 ||  || — || February 10, 2002 || Socorro || LINEAR || NYS || align=right | 3.4 km || 
|-id=685 bgcolor=#E9E9E9
| 126685 ||  || — || February 10, 2002 || Socorro || LINEAR || — || align=right | 2.2 km || 
|-id=686 bgcolor=#d6d6d6
| 126686 ||  || — || February 11, 2002 || Socorro || LINEAR || — || align=right | 4.1 km || 
|-id=687 bgcolor=#fefefe
| 126687 ||  || — || February 11, 2002 || Socorro || LINEAR || MAS || align=right | 1.6 km || 
|-id=688 bgcolor=#E9E9E9
| 126688 ||  || — || February 11, 2002 || Socorro || LINEAR || — || align=right | 2.0 km || 
|-id=689 bgcolor=#E9E9E9
| 126689 ||  || — || February 11, 2002 || Socorro || LINEAR || HEN || align=right | 2.0 km || 
|-id=690 bgcolor=#E9E9E9
| 126690 ||  || — || February 4, 2002 || Haleakala || NEAT || — || align=right | 2.7 km || 
|-id=691 bgcolor=#E9E9E9
| 126691 ||  || — || February 3, 2002 || Haleakala || NEAT || — || align=right | 3.1 km || 
|-id=692 bgcolor=#E9E9E9
| 126692 ||  || — || February 6, 2002 || Palomar || NEAT || — || align=right | 1.9 km || 
|-id=693 bgcolor=#fefefe
| 126693 ||  || — || February 6, 2002 || Palomar || NEAT || — || align=right | 1.4 km || 
|-id=694 bgcolor=#E9E9E9
| 126694 ||  || — || February 6, 2002 || Palomar || NEAT || — || align=right | 2.9 km || 
|-id=695 bgcolor=#E9E9E9
| 126695 ||  || — || February 6, 2002 || Palomar || NEAT || — || align=right | 3.5 km || 
|-id=696 bgcolor=#d6d6d6
| 126696 ||  || — || February 8, 2002 || Kitt Peak || Spacewatch || — || align=right | 4.0 km || 
|-id=697 bgcolor=#d6d6d6
| 126697 ||  || — || February 10, 2002 || Kitt Peak || Spacewatch || KOR || align=right | 2.7 km || 
|-id=698 bgcolor=#E9E9E9
| 126698 ||  || — || February 8, 2002 || Socorro || LINEAR || — || align=right | 2.8 km || 
|-id=699 bgcolor=#fefefe
| 126699 ||  || — || February 10, 2002 || Socorro || LINEAR || NYS || align=right | 1.4 km || 
|-id=700 bgcolor=#E9E9E9
| 126700 ||  || — || February 10, 2002 || Socorro || LINEAR || GEF || align=right | 2.2 km || 
|}

126701–126800 

|-bgcolor=#E9E9E9
| 126701 ||  || — || February 11, 2002 || Socorro || LINEAR || — || align=right | 2.9 km || 
|-id=702 bgcolor=#E9E9E9
| 126702 ||  || — || February 11, 2002 || Socorro || LINEAR || — || align=right | 4.6 km || 
|-id=703 bgcolor=#E9E9E9
| 126703 ||  || — || February 11, 2002 || Socorro || LINEAR || — || align=right | 2.8 km || 
|-id=704 bgcolor=#E9E9E9
| 126704 ||  || — || February 11, 2002 || Socorro || LINEAR || RAF || align=right | 1.7 km || 
|-id=705 bgcolor=#E9E9E9
| 126705 ||  || — || February 11, 2002 || Socorro || LINEAR || — || align=right | 3.2 km || 
|-id=706 bgcolor=#fefefe
| 126706 ||  || — || February 11, 2002 || Socorro || LINEAR || — || align=right | 3.8 km || 
|-id=707 bgcolor=#E9E9E9
| 126707 ||  || — || February 11, 2002 || Socorro || LINEAR || — || align=right | 2.7 km || 
|-id=708 bgcolor=#E9E9E9
| 126708 ||  || — || February 11, 2002 || Socorro || LINEAR || — || align=right | 2.9 km || 
|-id=709 bgcolor=#E9E9E9
| 126709 ||  || — || February 11, 2002 || Socorro || LINEAR || MRX || align=right | 1.6 km || 
|-id=710 bgcolor=#d6d6d6
| 126710 ||  || — || February 11, 2002 || Socorro || LINEAR || EOS || align=right | 3.9 km || 
|-id=711 bgcolor=#d6d6d6
| 126711 ||  || — || February 11, 2002 || Socorro || LINEAR || EOS || align=right | 3.1 km || 
|-id=712 bgcolor=#E9E9E9
| 126712 ||  || — || February 11, 2002 || Socorro || LINEAR || HNA || align=right | 3.7 km || 
|-id=713 bgcolor=#E9E9E9
| 126713 ||  || — || February 11, 2002 || Socorro || LINEAR || — || align=right | 3.3 km || 
|-id=714 bgcolor=#E9E9E9
| 126714 ||  || — || February 11, 2002 || Socorro || LINEAR || — || align=right | 5.0 km || 
|-id=715 bgcolor=#E9E9E9
| 126715 ||  || — || February 15, 2002 || Kitt Peak || Spacewatch || — || align=right | 2.1 km || 
|-id=716 bgcolor=#E9E9E9
| 126716 ||  || — || February 15, 2002 || Socorro || LINEAR || — || align=right | 2.4 km || 
|-id=717 bgcolor=#d6d6d6
| 126717 ||  || — || February 15, 2002 || Socorro || LINEAR || THM || align=right | 8.4 km || 
|-id=718 bgcolor=#E9E9E9
| 126718 ||  || — || February 15, 2002 || Socorro || LINEAR || — || align=right | 1.9 km || 
|-id=719 bgcolor=#C2E0FF
| 126719 ||  || — || February 8, 2002 || Kitt Peak || M. W. Buie || cubewano?critical || align=right | 208 km || 
|-id=720 bgcolor=#d6d6d6
| 126720 ||  || — || February 2, 2002 || Palomar || NEAT || — || align=right | 5.7 km || 
|-id=721 bgcolor=#fefefe
| 126721 ||  || — || February 3, 2002 || Palomar || NEAT || FLO || align=right | 1.2 km || 
|-id=722 bgcolor=#d6d6d6
| 126722 ||  || — || February 5, 2002 || Anderson Mesa || LONEOS || EOS || align=right | 4.1 km || 
|-id=723 bgcolor=#E9E9E9
| 126723 ||  || — || February 6, 2002 || Anderson Mesa || LONEOS || — || align=right | 4.2 km || 
|-id=724 bgcolor=#E9E9E9
| 126724 ||  || — || February 6, 2002 || Socorro || LINEAR || — || align=right | 3.6 km || 
|-id=725 bgcolor=#d6d6d6
| 126725 ||  || — || February 6, 2002 || Socorro || LINEAR || EUP || align=right | 10 km || 
|-id=726 bgcolor=#E9E9E9
| 126726 ||  || — || February 6, 2002 || Socorro || LINEAR || GER || align=right | 2.9 km || 
|-id=727 bgcolor=#E9E9E9
| 126727 ||  || — || February 6, 2002 || Socorro || LINEAR || EUN || align=right | 1.9 km || 
|-id=728 bgcolor=#E9E9E9
| 126728 ||  || — || February 7, 2002 || Anderson Mesa || LONEOS || — || align=right | 2.2 km || 
|-id=729 bgcolor=#E9E9E9
| 126729 ||  || — || February 7, 2002 || Anderson Mesa || LONEOS || MAR || align=right | 2.1 km || 
|-id=730 bgcolor=#d6d6d6
| 126730 ||  || — || February 7, 2002 || Kitt Peak || Spacewatch || — || align=right | 3.8 km || 
|-id=731 bgcolor=#E9E9E9
| 126731 ||  || — || February 8, 2002 || Anderson Mesa || LONEOS || — || align=right | 2.3 km || 
|-id=732 bgcolor=#d6d6d6
| 126732 ||  || — || February 8, 2002 || Anderson Mesa || LONEOS || — || align=right | 5.8 km || 
|-id=733 bgcolor=#E9E9E9
| 126733 ||  || — || February 8, 2002 || Anderson Mesa || LONEOS || BRG || align=right | 3.2 km || 
|-id=734 bgcolor=#d6d6d6
| 126734 ||  || — || February 8, 2002 || Kitt Peak || Spacewatch || KOR || align=right | 2.3 km || 
|-id=735 bgcolor=#E9E9E9
| 126735 ||  || — || February 8, 2002 || Kitt Peak || Spacewatch || PAD || align=right | 2.3 km || 
|-id=736 bgcolor=#d6d6d6
| 126736 ||  || — || February 8, 2002 || Kitt Peak || Spacewatch || — || align=right | 4.7 km || 
|-id=737 bgcolor=#E9E9E9
| 126737 ||  || — || February 8, 2002 || Socorro || LINEAR || — || align=right | 4.1 km || 
|-id=738 bgcolor=#E9E9E9
| 126738 ||  || — || February 10, 2002 || Socorro || LINEAR || — || align=right | 2.1 km || 
|-id=739 bgcolor=#d6d6d6
| 126739 ||  || — || February 10, 2002 || Socorro || LINEAR || EOS || align=right | 3.4 km || 
|-id=740 bgcolor=#d6d6d6
| 126740 ||  || — || February 10, 2002 || Socorro || LINEAR || — || align=right | 5.4 km || 
|-id=741 bgcolor=#d6d6d6
| 126741 ||  || — || February 11, 2002 || Socorro || LINEAR || HYG || align=right | 4.8 km || 
|-id=742 bgcolor=#d6d6d6
| 126742 ||  || — || February 15, 2002 || Socorro || LINEAR || EOS || align=right | 3.4 km || 
|-id=743 bgcolor=#E9E9E9
| 126743 ||  || — || February 3, 2002 || Anderson Mesa || LONEOS || — || align=right | 1.8 km || 
|-id=744 bgcolor=#d6d6d6
| 126744 ||  || — || February 10, 2002 || Socorro || LINEAR || — || align=right | 5.8 km || 
|-id=745 bgcolor=#E9E9E9
| 126745 ||  || — || February 11, 2002 || Socorro || LINEAR || — || align=right | 1.3 km || 
|-id=746 bgcolor=#E9E9E9
| 126746 ||  || — || February 11, 2002 || Socorro || LINEAR || — || align=right | 1.5 km || 
|-id=747 bgcolor=#E9E9E9
| 126747 ||  || — || February 11, 2002 || Socorro || LINEAR || — || align=right | 4.7 km || 
|-id=748 bgcolor=#d6d6d6
| 126748 Mariegerbet || 2002 DP ||  || February 16, 2002 || Vicques || M. Ory || KOR || align=right | 2.8 km || 
|-id=749 bgcolor=#E9E9E9
| 126749 Johnjones ||  ||  || February 20, 2002 || Desert Moon || B. L. Stevens || — || align=right | 2.3 km || 
|-id=750 bgcolor=#E9E9E9
| 126750 ||  || — || February 19, 2002 || Socorro || LINEAR || — || align=right | 5.7 km || 
|-id=751 bgcolor=#E9E9E9
| 126751 ||  || — || February 19, 2002 || Socorro || LINEAR || HNS || align=right | 2.3 km || 
|-id=752 bgcolor=#d6d6d6
| 126752 ||  || — || February 17, 2002 || Needville || Needville Obs. || EOS || align=right | 4.2 km || 
|-id=753 bgcolor=#E9E9E9
| 126753 ||  || — || February 16, 2002 || Haleakala || NEAT || — || align=right | 4.9 km || 
|-id=754 bgcolor=#d6d6d6
| 126754 ||  || — || February 20, 2002 || Kitt Peak || Spacewatch || — || align=right | 5.5 km || 
|-id=755 bgcolor=#E9E9E9
| 126755 ||  || — || February 19, 2002 || Socorro || LINEAR || — || align=right | 2.5 km || 
|-id=756 bgcolor=#E9E9E9
| 126756 ||  || — || February 19, 2002 || Socorro || LINEAR || — || align=right | 3.2 km || 
|-id=757 bgcolor=#E9E9E9
| 126757 ||  || — || February 19, 2002 || Socorro || LINEAR || EUN || align=right | 2.0 km || 
|-id=758 bgcolor=#E9E9E9
| 126758 ||  || — || February 19, 2002 || Socorro || LINEAR || MAR || align=right | 2.3 km || 
|-id=759 bgcolor=#E9E9E9
| 126759 ||  || — || February 19, 2002 || Socorro || LINEAR || MAR || align=right | 2.4 km || 
|-id=760 bgcolor=#E9E9E9
| 126760 ||  || — || February 20, 2002 || Socorro || LINEAR || — || align=right | 1.8 km || 
|-id=761 bgcolor=#E9E9E9
| 126761 ||  || — || February 19, 2002 || Socorro || LINEAR || EMI || align=right | 2.3 km || 
|-id=762 bgcolor=#E9E9E9
| 126762 ||  || — || February 19, 2002 || Socorro || LINEAR || GAL || align=right | 2.7 km || 
|-id=763 bgcolor=#E9E9E9
| 126763 ||  || — || February 20, 2002 || Socorro || LINEAR || — || align=right | 3.0 km || 
|-id=764 bgcolor=#fefefe
| 126764 ||  || — || February 20, 2002 || Kitt Peak || Spacewatch || NYS || align=right | 1.5 km || 
|-id=765 bgcolor=#E9E9E9
| 126765 ||  || — || February 21, 2002 || Kitt Peak || Spacewatch || — || align=right | 1.5 km || 
|-id=766 bgcolor=#d6d6d6
| 126766 ||  || — || February 21, 2002 || Palomar || NEAT || — || align=right | 4.6 km || 
|-id=767 bgcolor=#fefefe
| 126767 ||  || — || February 22, 2002 || Palomar || NEAT || — || align=right | 2.1 km || 
|-id=768 bgcolor=#E9E9E9
| 126768 ||  || — || February 24, 2002 || Palomar || NEAT || HEN || align=right | 2.2 km || 
|-id=769 bgcolor=#d6d6d6
| 126769 ||  || — || February 24, 2002 || Palomar || NEAT || THM || align=right | 4.5 km || 
|-id=770 bgcolor=#E9E9E9
| 126770 ||  || — || February 16, 2002 || Palomar || NEAT || — || align=right | 1.9 km || 
|-id=771 bgcolor=#fefefe
| 126771 ||  || — || February 16, 2002 || Palomar || NEAT || — || align=right | 2.9 km || 
|-id=772 bgcolor=#d6d6d6
| 126772 ||  || — || February 19, 2002 || Kitt Peak || Spacewatch || — || align=right | 3.5 km || 
|-id=773 bgcolor=#d6d6d6
| 126773 ||  || — || February 19, 2002 || Socorro || LINEAR || FIR || align=right | 5.7 km || 
|-id=774 bgcolor=#d6d6d6
| 126774 ||  || — || February 20, 2002 || Anderson Mesa || LONEOS || — || align=right | 6.3 km || 
|-id=775 bgcolor=#fefefe
| 126775 ||  || — || February 20, 2002 || Socorro || LINEAR || — || align=right | 1.4 km || 
|-id=776 bgcolor=#d6d6d6
| 126776 ||  || — || March 7, 2002 || Cima Ekar || ADAS || KOR || align=right | 2.6 km || 
|-id=777 bgcolor=#E9E9E9
| 126777 ||  || — || March 7, 2002 || Cima Ekar || ADAS || — || align=right | 2.9 km || 
|-id=778 bgcolor=#E9E9E9
| 126778 ||  || — || March 10, 2002 || Cima Ekar || ADAS || — || align=right | 1.4 km || 
|-id=779 bgcolor=#d6d6d6
| 126779 ||  || — || March 10, 2002 || Nashville || R. Clingan || — || align=right | 6.5 km || 
|-id=780 bgcolor=#d6d6d6
| 126780 Ivovasiljev ||  ||  || March 10, 2002 || Kleť || KLENOT || — || align=right | 4.5 km || 
|-id=781 bgcolor=#fefefe
| 126781 ||  || — || March 13, 2002 || Črni Vrh || Črni Vrh || NYS || align=right | 1.5 km || 
|-id=782 bgcolor=#E9E9E9
| 126782 ||  || — || March 14, 2002 || Desert Eagle || W. K. Y. Yeung || — || align=right | 2.4 km || 
|-id=783 bgcolor=#d6d6d6
| 126783 ||  || — || March 4, 2002 || Kitt Peak || Spacewatch || KAR || align=right | 1.7 km || 
|-id=784 bgcolor=#E9E9E9
| 126784 ||  || — || March 5, 2002 || Kitt Peak || Spacewatch || — || align=right | 2.9 km || 
|-id=785 bgcolor=#fefefe
| 126785 ||  || — || March 5, 2002 || Palomar || NEAT || V || align=right | 1.1 km || 
|-id=786 bgcolor=#fefefe
| 126786 ||  || — || March 5, 2002 || Palomar || NEAT || MAS || align=right | 1.3 km || 
|-id=787 bgcolor=#d6d6d6
| 126787 ||  || — || March 6, 2002 || Palomar || NEAT || 615 || align=right | 2.6 km || 
|-id=788 bgcolor=#E9E9E9
| 126788 ||  || — || March 9, 2002 || Palomar || NEAT || — || align=right | 2.4 km || 
|-id=789 bgcolor=#E9E9E9
| 126789 ||  || — || March 9, 2002 || Socorro || LINEAR || — || align=right | 2.7 km || 
|-id=790 bgcolor=#E9E9E9
| 126790 ||  || — || March 9, 2002 || Socorro || LINEAR || NEM || align=right | 3.8 km || 
|-id=791 bgcolor=#fefefe
| 126791 ||  || — || March 9, 2002 || Socorro || LINEAR || MAS || align=right | 1.4 km || 
|-id=792 bgcolor=#E9E9E9
| 126792 ||  || — || March 10, 2002 || Haleakala || NEAT || MRX || align=right | 2.1 km || 
|-id=793 bgcolor=#E9E9E9
| 126793 ||  || — || March 10, 2002 || Haleakala || NEAT || — || align=right | 1.5 km || 
|-id=794 bgcolor=#E9E9E9
| 126794 ||  || — || March 10, 2002 || Haleakala || NEAT || — || align=right | 2.3 km || 
|-id=795 bgcolor=#d6d6d6
| 126795 ||  || — || March 5, 2002 || Kitt Peak || Spacewatch || — || align=right | 4.5 km || 
|-id=796 bgcolor=#E9E9E9
| 126796 ||  || — || March 5, 2002 || Kitt Peak || Spacewatch || — || align=right | 1.4 km || 
|-id=797 bgcolor=#E9E9E9
| 126797 ||  || — || March 10, 2002 || Anderson Mesa || LONEOS || — || align=right | 1.9 km || 
|-id=798 bgcolor=#fefefe
| 126798 ||  || — || March 9, 2002 || Kitt Peak || Spacewatch || — || align=right | 1.5 km || 
|-id=799 bgcolor=#d6d6d6
| 126799 ||  || — || March 9, 2002 || Socorro || LINEAR || KOR || align=right | 2.5 km || 
|-id=800 bgcolor=#d6d6d6
| 126800 ||  || — || March 9, 2002 || Socorro || LINEAR || — || align=right | 4.8 km || 
|}

126801–126900 

|-bgcolor=#E9E9E9
| 126801 ||  || — || March 9, 2002 || Socorro || LINEAR || — || align=right | 2.6 km || 
|-id=802 bgcolor=#E9E9E9
| 126802 ||  || — || March 9, 2002 || Socorro || LINEAR || — || align=right | 3.6 km || 
|-id=803 bgcolor=#E9E9E9
| 126803 ||  || — || March 9, 2002 || Socorro || LINEAR || — || align=right | 3.1 km || 
|-id=804 bgcolor=#E9E9E9
| 126804 ||  || — || March 9, 2002 || Socorro || LINEAR || — || align=right | 4.2 km || 
|-id=805 bgcolor=#d6d6d6
| 126805 ||  || — || March 9, 2002 || Kitt Peak || Spacewatch || — || align=right | 3.3 km || 
|-id=806 bgcolor=#d6d6d6
| 126806 ||  || — || March 12, 2002 || Kitt Peak || Spacewatch || KAR || align=right | 2.2 km || 
|-id=807 bgcolor=#fefefe
| 126807 ||  || — || March 9, 2002 || Socorro || LINEAR || — || align=right | 6.5 km || 
|-id=808 bgcolor=#E9E9E9
| 126808 ||  || — || March 9, 2002 || Socorro || LINEAR || AGN || align=right | 2.7 km || 
|-id=809 bgcolor=#d6d6d6
| 126809 ||  || — || March 9, 2002 || Socorro || LINEAR || — || align=right | 4.7 km || 
|-id=810 bgcolor=#fefefe
| 126810 ||  || — || March 10, 2002 || Socorro || LINEAR || NYS || align=right | 1.7 km || 
|-id=811 bgcolor=#E9E9E9
| 126811 ||  || — || March 12, 2002 || Socorro || LINEAR || — || align=right | 3.0 km || 
|-id=812 bgcolor=#d6d6d6
| 126812 ||  || — || March 12, 2002 || Socorro || LINEAR || — || align=right | 4.2 km || 
|-id=813 bgcolor=#E9E9E9
| 126813 ||  || — || March 12, 2002 || Socorro || LINEAR || — || align=right | 1.7 km || 
|-id=814 bgcolor=#E9E9E9
| 126814 ||  || — || March 12, 2002 || Socorro || LINEAR || DOR || align=right | 4.8 km || 
|-id=815 bgcolor=#E9E9E9
| 126815 ||  || — || March 10, 2002 || Haleakala || NEAT || — || align=right | 3.7 km || 
|-id=816 bgcolor=#E9E9E9
| 126816 ||  || — || March 11, 2002 || Palomar || NEAT || XIZ || align=right | 2.1 km || 
|-id=817 bgcolor=#E9E9E9
| 126817 ||  || — || March 9, 2002 || Socorro || LINEAR || — || align=right | 2.5 km || 
|-id=818 bgcolor=#E9E9E9
| 126818 ||  || — || March 9, 2002 || Socorro || LINEAR || — || align=right | 3.9 km || 
|-id=819 bgcolor=#E9E9E9
| 126819 ||  || — || March 9, 2002 || Socorro || LINEAR || HEN || align=right | 2.3 km || 
|-id=820 bgcolor=#d6d6d6
| 126820 ||  || — || March 13, 2002 || Socorro || LINEAR || — || align=right | 4.2 km || 
|-id=821 bgcolor=#E9E9E9
| 126821 ||  || — || March 9, 2002 || Socorro || LINEAR || — || align=right | 3.1 km || 
|-id=822 bgcolor=#E9E9E9
| 126822 ||  || — || March 13, 2002 || Socorro || LINEAR || — || align=right | 1.9 km || 
|-id=823 bgcolor=#d6d6d6
| 126823 ||  || — || March 13, 2002 || Socorro || LINEAR || — || align=right | 5.8 km || 
|-id=824 bgcolor=#d6d6d6
| 126824 ||  || — || March 13, 2002 || Socorro || LINEAR || — || align=right | 4.3 km || 
|-id=825 bgcolor=#E9E9E9
| 126825 ||  || — || March 13, 2002 || Socorro || LINEAR || — || align=right | 2.0 km || 
|-id=826 bgcolor=#E9E9E9
| 126826 ||  || — || March 13, 2002 || Socorro || LINEAR || — || align=right | 3.1 km || 
|-id=827 bgcolor=#E9E9E9
| 126827 ||  || — || March 13, 2002 || Socorro || LINEAR || — || align=right | 1.7 km || 
|-id=828 bgcolor=#E9E9E9
| 126828 ||  || — || March 13, 2002 || Socorro || LINEAR || — || align=right | 2.2 km || 
|-id=829 bgcolor=#E9E9E9
| 126829 ||  || — || March 13, 2002 || Socorro || LINEAR || AGN || align=right | 2.0 km || 
|-id=830 bgcolor=#E9E9E9
| 126830 ||  || — || March 13, 2002 || Socorro || LINEAR || — || align=right | 1.8 km || 
|-id=831 bgcolor=#fefefe
| 126831 ||  || — || March 13, 2002 || Socorro || LINEAR || NYS || align=right | 1.1 km || 
|-id=832 bgcolor=#E9E9E9
| 126832 ||  || — || March 13, 2002 || Socorro || LINEAR || PAD || align=right | 2.7 km || 
|-id=833 bgcolor=#E9E9E9
| 126833 ||  || — || March 13, 2002 || Socorro || LINEAR || — || align=right | 1.8 km || 
|-id=834 bgcolor=#d6d6d6
| 126834 ||  || — || March 13, 2002 || Socorro || LINEAR || — || align=right | 4.3 km || 
|-id=835 bgcolor=#E9E9E9
| 126835 ||  || — || March 13, 2002 || Socorro || LINEAR || — || align=right | 2.7 km || 
|-id=836 bgcolor=#E9E9E9
| 126836 ||  || — || March 13, 2002 || Socorro || LINEAR || — || align=right | 2.4 km || 
|-id=837 bgcolor=#E9E9E9
| 126837 ||  || — || March 13, 2002 || Socorro || LINEAR || — || align=right | 2.2 km || 
|-id=838 bgcolor=#d6d6d6
| 126838 ||  || — || March 13, 2002 || Socorro || LINEAR || — || align=right | 4.5 km || 
|-id=839 bgcolor=#E9E9E9
| 126839 ||  || — || March 13, 2002 || Socorro || LINEAR || — || align=right | 1.9 km || 
|-id=840 bgcolor=#d6d6d6
| 126840 ||  || — || March 13, 2002 || Socorro || LINEAR || — || align=right | 4.0 km || 
|-id=841 bgcolor=#E9E9E9
| 126841 ||  || — || March 13, 2002 || Socorro || LINEAR || GEF || align=right | 2.6 km || 
|-id=842 bgcolor=#E9E9E9
| 126842 ||  || — || March 13, 2002 || Socorro || LINEAR || — || align=right | 3.9 km || 
|-id=843 bgcolor=#E9E9E9
| 126843 ||  || — || March 13, 2002 || Socorro || LINEAR || — || align=right | 2.7 km || 
|-id=844 bgcolor=#d6d6d6
| 126844 ||  || — || March 13, 2002 || Socorro || LINEAR || EOS || align=right | 3.1 km || 
|-id=845 bgcolor=#E9E9E9
| 126845 ||  || — || March 13, 2002 || Socorro || LINEAR || — || align=right | 2.3 km || 
|-id=846 bgcolor=#E9E9E9
| 126846 ||  || — || March 13, 2002 || Socorro || LINEAR || EUN || align=right | 2.8 km || 
|-id=847 bgcolor=#E9E9E9
| 126847 ||  || — || March 13, 2002 || Socorro || LINEAR || — || align=right | 2.7 km || 
|-id=848 bgcolor=#d6d6d6
| 126848 ||  || — || March 13, 2002 || Socorro || LINEAR || — || align=right | 6.4 km || 
|-id=849 bgcolor=#E9E9E9
| 126849 ||  || — || March 13, 2002 || Socorro || LINEAR || — || align=right | 2.4 km || 
|-id=850 bgcolor=#E9E9E9
| 126850 ||  || — || March 13, 2002 || Socorro || LINEAR || — || align=right | 3.2 km || 
|-id=851 bgcolor=#E9E9E9
| 126851 ||  || — || March 13, 2002 || Socorro || LINEAR || — || align=right | 3.6 km || 
|-id=852 bgcolor=#d6d6d6
| 126852 ||  || — || March 13, 2002 || Socorro || LINEAR || — || align=right | 8.0 km || 
|-id=853 bgcolor=#d6d6d6
| 126853 ||  || — || March 13, 2002 || Socorro || LINEAR || URS || align=right | 6.8 km || 
|-id=854 bgcolor=#E9E9E9
| 126854 ||  || — || March 13, 2002 || Socorro || LINEAR || — || align=right | 1.8 km || 
|-id=855 bgcolor=#E9E9E9
| 126855 ||  || — || March 13, 2002 || Socorro || LINEAR || — || align=right | 2.6 km || 
|-id=856 bgcolor=#E9E9E9
| 126856 ||  || — || March 14, 2002 || Socorro || LINEAR || — || align=right | 3.2 km || 
|-id=857 bgcolor=#d6d6d6
| 126857 ||  || — || March 11, 2002 || Kitt Peak || Spacewatch || — || align=right | 3.9 km || 
|-id=858 bgcolor=#E9E9E9
| 126858 ||  || — || March 15, 2002 || Kitt Peak || Spacewatch || — || align=right | 3.1 km || 
|-id=859 bgcolor=#d6d6d6
| 126859 ||  || — || March 10, 2002 || Haleakala || NEAT || — || align=right | 5.9 km || 
|-id=860 bgcolor=#E9E9E9
| 126860 ||  || — || March 10, 2002 || Haleakala || NEAT || — || align=right | 4.6 km || 
|-id=861 bgcolor=#E9E9E9
| 126861 ||  || — || March 13, 2002 || Palomar || NEAT || — || align=right | 3.1 km || 
|-id=862 bgcolor=#E9E9E9
| 126862 ||  || — || March 9, 2002 || Socorro || LINEAR || AGN || align=right | 2.8 km || 
|-id=863 bgcolor=#d6d6d6
| 126863 ||  || — || March 9, 2002 || Socorro || LINEAR || — || align=right | 5.1 km || 
|-id=864 bgcolor=#d6d6d6
| 126864 ||  || — || March 9, 2002 || Socorro || LINEAR || — || align=right | 4.8 km || 
|-id=865 bgcolor=#d6d6d6
| 126865 ||  || — || March 9, 2002 || Socorro || LINEAR || — || align=right | 4.0 km || 
|-id=866 bgcolor=#E9E9E9
| 126866 ||  || — || March 9, 2002 || Socorro || LINEAR || — || align=right | 4.6 km || 
|-id=867 bgcolor=#E9E9E9
| 126867 ||  || — || March 9, 2002 || Socorro || LINEAR || — || align=right | 1.9 km || 
|-id=868 bgcolor=#fefefe
| 126868 ||  || — || March 9, 2002 || Socorro || LINEAR || NYS || align=right | 1.6 km || 
|-id=869 bgcolor=#E9E9E9
| 126869 ||  || — || March 9, 2002 || Socorro || LINEAR || — || align=right | 3.1 km || 
|-id=870 bgcolor=#E9E9E9
| 126870 ||  || — || March 9, 2002 || Socorro || LINEAR || — || align=right | 2.1 km || 
|-id=871 bgcolor=#d6d6d6
| 126871 ||  || — || March 9, 2002 || Socorro || LINEAR || THM || align=right | 5.9 km || 
|-id=872 bgcolor=#E9E9E9
| 126872 ||  || — || March 9, 2002 || Socorro || LINEAR || — || align=right | 2.7 km || 
|-id=873 bgcolor=#d6d6d6
| 126873 ||  || — || March 9, 2002 || Socorro || LINEAR || — || align=right | 5.2 km || 
|-id=874 bgcolor=#E9E9E9
| 126874 ||  || — || March 9, 2002 || Socorro || LINEAR || — || align=right | 1.8 km || 
|-id=875 bgcolor=#d6d6d6
| 126875 ||  || — || March 11, 2002 || Socorro || LINEAR || — || align=right | 6.2 km || 
|-id=876 bgcolor=#d6d6d6
| 126876 ||  || — || March 12, 2002 || Socorro || LINEAR || — || align=right | 4.9 km || 
|-id=877 bgcolor=#E9E9E9
| 126877 ||  || — || March 12, 2002 || Socorro || LINEAR || — || align=right | 1.9 km || 
|-id=878 bgcolor=#E9E9E9
| 126878 ||  || — || March 12, 2002 || Socorro || LINEAR || — || align=right | 4.8 km || 
|-id=879 bgcolor=#fefefe
| 126879 ||  || — || March 14, 2002 || Socorro || LINEAR || MAS || align=right | 1.5 km || 
|-id=880 bgcolor=#E9E9E9
| 126880 ||  || — || March 14, 2002 || Socorro || LINEAR || — || align=right | 2.5 km || 
|-id=881 bgcolor=#E9E9E9
| 126881 ||  || — || March 10, 2002 || Kitt Peak || Spacewatch || — || align=right | 1.7 km || 
|-id=882 bgcolor=#E9E9E9
| 126882 ||  || — || March 11, 2002 || Socorro || LINEAR || DOR || align=right | 5.8 km || 
|-id=883 bgcolor=#E9E9E9
| 126883 ||  || — || March 13, 2002 || Socorro || LINEAR || — || align=right | 2.7 km || 
|-id=884 bgcolor=#E9E9E9
| 126884 ||  || — || March 13, 2002 || Socorro || LINEAR || — || align=right | 4.3 km || 
|-id=885 bgcolor=#d6d6d6
| 126885 ||  || — || March 15, 2002 || Socorro || LINEAR || — || align=right | 5.4 km || 
|-id=886 bgcolor=#E9E9E9
| 126886 ||  || — || March 15, 2002 || Socorro || LINEAR || — || align=right | 4.2 km || 
|-id=887 bgcolor=#E9E9E9
| 126887 ||  || — || March 2, 2002 || Anderson Mesa || LONEOS || — || align=right | 1.9 km || 
|-id=888 bgcolor=#E9E9E9
| 126888 Tspitzer ||  ||  || March 5, 2002 || Catalina || CSS || — || align=right | 1.6 km || 
|-id=889 bgcolor=#E9E9E9
| 126889 ||  || — || March 6, 2002 || Socorro || LINEAR || EUN || align=right | 2.8 km || 
|-id=890 bgcolor=#E9E9E9
| 126890 ||  || — || March 6, 2002 || Socorro || LINEAR || — || align=right | 3.1 km || 
|-id=891 bgcolor=#d6d6d6
| 126891 ||  || — || March 9, 2002 || Anderson Mesa || LONEOS || EOS || align=right | 4.9 km || 
|-id=892 bgcolor=#E9E9E9
| 126892 ||  || — || March 9, 2002 || Anderson Mesa || LONEOS || RAF || align=right | 2.2 km || 
|-id=893 bgcolor=#E9E9E9
| 126893 ||  || — || March 9, 2002 || Anderson Mesa || LONEOS || — || align=right | 4.7 km || 
|-id=894 bgcolor=#E9E9E9
| 126894 ||  || — || March 9, 2002 || Socorro || LINEAR || — || align=right | 2.6 km || 
|-id=895 bgcolor=#E9E9E9
| 126895 ||  || — || March 9, 2002 || Anderson Mesa || LONEOS || — || align=right | 3.5 km || 
|-id=896 bgcolor=#d6d6d6
| 126896 ||  || — || March 9, 2002 || Anderson Mesa || LONEOS || — || align=right | 8.1 km || 
|-id=897 bgcolor=#d6d6d6
| 126897 ||  || — || March 9, 2002 || Anderson Mesa || LONEOS || — || align=right | 6.5 km || 
|-id=898 bgcolor=#d6d6d6
| 126898 ||  || — || March 9, 2002 || Anderson Mesa || LONEOS || EOS || align=right | 3.7 km || 
|-id=899 bgcolor=#E9E9E9
| 126899 ||  || — || March 10, 2002 || Kitt Peak || Spacewatch || — || align=right | 2.3 km || 
|-id=900 bgcolor=#E9E9E9
| 126900 ||  || — || March 9, 2002 || Palomar || NEAT || — || align=right | 2.0 km || 
|}

126901–127000 

|-bgcolor=#E9E9E9
| 126901 Craigstevens ||  ||  || March 9, 2002 || Catalina || CSS || — || align=right | 3.1 km || 
|-id=902 bgcolor=#E9E9E9
| 126902 ||  || — || March 9, 2002 || Catalina || CSS || MRX || align=right | 2.2 km || 
|-id=903 bgcolor=#E9E9E9
| 126903 ||  || — || March 9, 2002 || Anderson Mesa || LONEOS || — || align=right | 1.9 km || 
|-id=904 bgcolor=#E9E9E9
| 126904 ||  || — || March 9, 2002 || Anderson Mesa || LONEOS || — || align=right | 5.0 km || 
|-id=905 bgcolor=#d6d6d6
| 126905 Junetveekrem ||  ||  || March 9, 2002 || Catalina || CSS || EOS || align=right | 3.8 km || 
|-id=906 bgcolor=#d6d6d6
| 126906 Andykulessa ||  ||  || March 10, 2002 || Goodricke-Pigott || R. A. Tucker || — || align=right | 8.3 km || 
|-id=907 bgcolor=#E9E9E9
| 126907 ||  || — || March 10, 2002 || Haleakala || NEAT || WIT || align=right | 2.2 km || 
|-id=908 bgcolor=#d6d6d6
| 126908 ||  || — || March 10, 2002 || Haleakala || NEAT || — || align=right | 3.3 km || 
|-id=909 bgcolor=#E9E9E9
| 126909 ||  || — || March 10, 2002 || Kitt Peak || Spacewatch || — || align=right | 3.8 km || 
|-id=910 bgcolor=#E9E9E9
| 126910 ||  || — || March 12, 2002 || Palomar || NEAT || — || align=right | 2.0 km || 
|-id=911 bgcolor=#d6d6d6
| 126911 ||  || — || March 12, 2002 || Palomar || NEAT || — || align=right | 4.0 km || 
|-id=912 bgcolor=#d6d6d6
| 126912 ||  || — || March 12, 2002 || Anderson Mesa || LONEOS || — || align=right | 5.1 km || 
|-id=913 bgcolor=#E9E9E9
| 126913 ||  || — || March 12, 2002 || Palomar || NEAT || — || align=right | 2.7 km || 
|-id=914 bgcolor=#d6d6d6
| 126914 ||  || — || March 10, 2002 || Haleakala || NEAT || KOR || align=right | 2.9 km || 
|-id=915 bgcolor=#E9E9E9
| 126915 ||  || — || March 11, 2002 || Socorro || LINEAR || — || align=right | 2.2 km || 
|-id=916 bgcolor=#E9E9E9
| 126916 ||  || — || March 12, 2002 || Palomar || NEAT || — || align=right | 2.0 km || 
|-id=917 bgcolor=#d6d6d6
| 126917 ||  || — || March 12, 2002 || Palomar || NEAT || — || align=right | 4.5 km || 
|-id=918 bgcolor=#E9E9E9
| 126918 ||  || — || March 13, 2002 || Socorro || LINEAR || — || align=right | 4.9 km || 
|-id=919 bgcolor=#E9E9E9
| 126919 ||  || — || March 13, 2002 || Kitt Peak || Spacewatch || — || align=right | 2.0 km || 
|-id=920 bgcolor=#d6d6d6
| 126920 ||  || — || March 13, 2002 || Kitt Peak || Spacewatch || — || align=right | 4.5 km || 
|-id=921 bgcolor=#E9E9E9
| 126921 ||  || — || March 13, 2002 || Socorro || LINEAR || — || align=right | 2.9 km || 
|-id=922 bgcolor=#d6d6d6
| 126922 ||  || — || March 13, 2002 || Socorro || LINEAR || KAR || align=right | 2.3 km || 
|-id=923 bgcolor=#E9E9E9
| 126923 ||  || — || March 13, 2002 || Palomar || NEAT || — || align=right | 1.7 km || 
|-id=924 bgcolor=#E9E9E9
| 126924 ||  || — || March 13, 2002 || Palomar || NEAT || — || align=right | 2.4 km || 
|-id=925 bgcolor=#E9E9E9
| 126925 ||  || — || March 12, 2002 || Palomar || NEAT || AGN || align=right | 2.1 km || 
|-id=926 bgcolor=#E9E9E9
| 126926 ||  || — || March 12, 2002 || Palomar || NEAT || — || align=right | 1.9 km || 
|-id=927 bgcolor=#E9E9E9
| 126927 ||  || — || March 12, 2002 || Palomar || NEAT || — || align=right | 3.8 km || 
|-id=928 bgcolor=#d6d6d6
| 126928 ||  || — || March 12, 2002 || Anderson Mesa || LONEOS || — || align=right | 5.0 km || 
|-id=929 bgcolor=#d6d6d6
| 126929 ||  || — || March 12, 2002 || Palomar || NEAT || KAR || align=right | 2.2 km || 
|-id=930 bgcolor=#d6d6d6
| 126930 ||  || — || March 12, 2002 || Palomar || NEAT || — || align=right | 3.6 km || 
|-id=931 bgcolor=#E9E9E9
| 126931 ||  || — || March 13, 2002 || Socorro || LINEAR || — || align=right | 2.9 km || 
|-id=932 bgcolor=#E9E9E9
| 126932 ||  || — || March 13, 2002 || Socorro || LINEAR || — || align=right | 2.8 km || 
|-id=933 bgcolor=#E9E9E9
| 126933 ||  || — || March 13, 2002 || Socorro || LINEAR || — || align=right | 2.5 km || 
|-id=934 bgcolor=#fefefe
| 126934 ||  || — || March 14, 2002 || Socorro || LINEAR || NYS || align=right | 1.3 km || 
|-id=935 bgcolor=#E9E9E9
| 126935 ||  || — || March 14, 2002 || Anderson Mesa || LONEOS || — || align=right | 3.1 km || 
|-id=936 bgcolor=#d6d6d6
| 126936 ||  || — || March 15, 2002 || Socorro || LINEAR || — || align=right | 4.2 km || 
|-id=937 bgcolor=#d6d6d6
| 126937 ||  || — || March 15, 2002 || Palomar || NEAT || ITH || align=right | 2.7 km || 
|-id=938 bgcolor=#d6d6d6
| 126938 ||  || — || March 15, 2002 || Palomar || NEAT || EOS || align=right | 4.1 km || 
|-id=939 bgcolor=#d6d6d6
| 126939 ||  || — || March 15, 2002 || Kitt Peak || Spacewatch || — || align=right | 5.1 km || 
|-id=940 bgcolor=#E9E9E9
| 126940 || 2002 FJ || — || March 16, 2002 || Desert Eagle || W. K. Y. Yeung || — || align=right | 3.9 km || 
|-id=941 bgcolor=#E9E9E9
| 126941 || 2002 FL || — || March 16, 2002 || Desert Eagle || W. K. Y. Yeung || — || align=right | 2.6 km || 
|-id=942 bgcolor=#E9E9E9
| 126942 || 2002 FP || — || March 18, 2002 || Desert Eagle || W. K. Y. Yeung || PAD || align=right | 4.8 km || 
|-id=943 bgcolor=#d6d6d6
| 126943 || 2002 FX || — || March 18, 2002 || Desert Eagle || W. K. Y. Yeung || THM || align=right | 5.0 km || 
|-id=944 bgcolor=#E9E9E9
| 126944 ||  || — || March 19, 2002 || Fountain Hills || Fountain Hills Obs. || — || align=right | 4.1 km || 
|-id=945 bgcolor=#E9E9E9
| 126945 ||  || — || March 19, 2002 || Desert Eagle || W. K. Y. Yeung || HNA || align=right | 5.2 km || 
|-id=946 bgcolor=#E9E9E9
| 126946 ||  || — || March 19, 2002 || Desert Eagle || W. K. Y. Yeung || — || align=right | 4.4 km || 
|-id=947 bgcolor=#d6d6d6
| 126947 ||  || — || March 18, 2002 || Desert Eagle || W. K. Y. Yeung || — || align=right | 4.8 km || 
|-id=948 bgcolor=#d6d6d6
| 126948 ||  || — || March 20, 2002 || Desert Eagle || W. K. Y. Yeung || — || align=right | 6.6 km || 
|-id=949 bgcolor=#E9E9E9
| 126949 ||  || — || March 16, 2002 || Farpoint || G. Hug || PAD || align=right | 4.7 km || 
|-id=950 bgcolor=#E9E9E9
| 126950 ||  || — || March 23, 2002 || Nogales || Tenagra II Obs. || — || align=right | 4.6 km || 
|-id=951 bgcolor=#E9E9E9
| 126951 ||  || — || March 16, 2002 || Socorro || LINEAR || — || align=right | 4.7 km || 
|-id=952 bgcolor=#E9E9E9
| 126952 ||  || — || March 16, 2002 || Socorro || LINEAR || — || align=right | 1.8 km || 
|-id=953 bgcolor=#E9E9E9
| 126953 ||  || — || March 16, 2002 || Socorro || LINEAR || — || align=right | 3.4 km || 
|-id=954 bgcolor=#E9E9E9
| 126954 ||  || — || March 17, 2002 || Socorro || LINEAR || — || align=right | 4.1 km || 
|-id=955 bgcolor=#E9E9E9
| 126955 ||  || — || March 17, 2002 || Socorro || LINEAR || GEF || align=right | 2.5 km || 
|-id=956 bgcolor=#E9E9E9
| 126956 ||  || — || March 17, 2002 || Kitt Peak || Spacewatch || — || align=right | 1.5 km || 
|-id=957 bgcolor=#E9E9E9
| 126957 ||  || — || March 16, 2002 || Anderson Mesa || LONEOS || JUN || align=right | 2.3 km || 
|-id=958 bgcolor=#d6d6d6
| 126958 ||  || — || March 16, 2002 || Haleakala || NEAT || EOS || align=right | 4.0 km || 
|-id=959 bgcolor=#E9E9E9
| 126959 ||  || — || March 16, 2002 || Haleakala || NEAT || MAR || align=right | 2.3 km || 
|-id=960 bgcolor=#E9E9E9
| 126960 ||  || — || March 16, 2002 || Anderson Mesa || LONEOS || — || align=right | 3.5 km || 
|-id=961 bgcolor=#d6d6d6
| 126961 ||  || — || March 16, 2002 || Haleakala || NEAT || — || align=right | 5.1 km || 
|-id=962 bgcolor=#E9E9E9
| 126962 ||  || — || March 16, 2002 || Haleakala || NEAT || — || align=right | 5.1 km || 
|-id=963 bgcolor=#E9E9E9
| 126963 ||  || — || March 16, 2002 || Haleakala || NEAT || — || align=right | 4.6 km || 
|-id=964 bgcolor=#fefefe
| 126964 ||  || — || March 17, 2002 || Socorro || LINEAR || — || align=right | 2.3 km || 
|-id=965 bgcolor=#fefefe
| 126965 Neri ||  ||  || March 18, 2002 || Kitt Peak || M. W. Buie || NYS || align=right | 1.3 km || 
|-id=966 bgcolor=#E9E9E9
| 126966 ||  || — || March 18, 2002 || Socorro || LINEAR || PAD || align=right | 3.9 km || 
|-id=967 bgcolor=#d6d6d6
| 126967 ||  || — || March 18, 2002 || Haleakala || NEAT || — || align=right | 6.8 km || 
|-id=968 bgcolor=#E9E9E9
| 126968 ||  || — || March 19, 2002 || Palomar || NEAT || — || align=right | 2.8 km || 
|-id=969 bgcolor=#E9E9E9
| 126969 ||  || — || March 19, 2002 || Palomar || NEAT || — || align=right | 3.2 km || 
|-id=970 bgcolor=#E9E9E9
| 126970 ||  || — || March 19, 2002 || Socorro || LINEAR || — || align=right | 5.2 km || 
|-id=971 bgcolor=#E9E9E9
| 126971 ||  || — || March 19, 2002 || Socorro || LINEAR || — || align=right | 3.1 km || 
|-id=972 bgcolor=#fefefe
| 126972 ||  || — || March 19, 2002 || Palomar || NEAT || — || align=right | 3.0 km || 
|-id=973 bgcolor=#E9E9E9
| 126973 ||  || — || March 19, 2002 || Socorro || LINEAR || — || align=right | 5.2 km || 
|-id=974 bgcolor=#E9E9E9
| 126974 ||  || — || March 19, 2002 || Haleakala || NEAT || — || align=right | 6.0 km || 
|-id=975 bgcolor=#d6d6d6
| 126975 ||  || — || March 17, 2002 || Kitt Peak || Spacewatch || KAR || align=right | 1.7 km || 
|-id=976 bgcolor=#E9E9E9
| 126976 ||  || — || March 18, 2002 || Kitt Peak || Spacewatch || — || align=right | 2.2 km || 
|-id=977 bgcolor=#E9E9E9
| 126977 ||  || — || March 19, 2002 || Palomar || NEAT || MAR || align=right | 2.1 km || 
|-id=978 bgcolor=#d6d6d6
| 126978 ||  || — || March 19, 2002 || Palomar || NEAT || URS || align=right | 7.2 km || 
|-id=979 bgcolor=#d6d6d6
| 126979 ||  || — || March 19, 2002 || Haleakala || NEAT || — || align=right | 5.1 km || 
|-id=980 bgcolor=#E9E9E9
| 126980 ||  || — || March 20, 2002 || Palomar || NEAT || MAR || align=right | 2.1 km || 
|-id=981 bgcolor=#d6d6d6
| 126981 ||  || — || March 20, 2002 || Socorro || LINEAR || TEL || align=right | 3.5 km || 
|-id=982 bgcolor=#E9E9E9
| 126982 ||  || — || March 20, 2002 || Socorro || LINEAR || MIT || align=right | 3.9 km || 
|-id=983 bgcolor=#d6d6d6
| 126983 ||  || — || March 20, 2002 || Socorro || LINEAR || — || align=right | 6.6 km || 
|-id=984 bgcolor=#E9E9E9
| 126984 ||  || — || March 20, 2002 || Socorro || LINEAR || — || align=right | 3.2 km || 
|-id=985 bgcolor=#E9E9E9
| 126985 ||  || — || March 20, 2002 || Socorro || LINEAR || — || align=right | 1.7 km || 
|-id=986 bgcolor=#d6d6d6
| 126986 ||  || — || March 20, 2002 || Socorro || LINEAR || — || align=right | 4.2 km || 
|-id=987 bgcolor=#d6d6d6
| 126987 ||  || — || March 20, 2002 || Socorro || LINEAR || BRA || align=right | 3.2 km || 
|-id=988 bgcolor=#d6d6d6
| 126988 ||  || — || March 20, 2002 || Socorro || LINEAR || — || align=right | 7.8 km || 
|-id=989 bgcolor=#E9E9E9
| 126989 ||  || — || March 20, 2002 || Anderson Mesa || LONEOS || WIT || align=right | 1.8 km || 
|-id=990 bgcolor=#E9E9E9
| 126990 ||  || — || March 20, 2002 || Anderson Mesa || LONEOS || NEM || align=right | 4.0 km || 
|-id=991 bgcolor=#E9E9E9
| 126991 ||  || — || March 20, 2002 || Anderson Mesa || LONEOS || — || align=right | 2.4 km || 
|-id=992 bgcolor=#E9E9E9
| 126992 ||  || — || March 20, 2002 || Socorro || LINEAR || — || align=right | 4.2 km || 
|-id=993 bgcolor=#d6d6d6
| 126993 ||  || — || March 20, 2002 || Socorro || LINEAR || — || align=right | 6.3 km || 
|-id=994 bgcolor=#E9E9E9
| 126994 ||  || — || March 20, 2002 || Socorro || LINEAR || — || align=right | 3.3 km || 
|-id=995 bgcolor=#E9E9E9
| 126995 ||  || — || March 20, 2002 || Kitt Peak || Spacewatch || — || align=right | 4.1 km || 
|-id=996 bgcolor=#E9E9E9
| 126996 ||  || — || March 21, 2002 || Anderson Mesa || LONEOS || — || align=right | 2.1 km || 
|-id=997 bgcolor=#E9E9E9
| 126997 ||  || — || March 21, 2002 || Anderson Mesa || LONEOS || — || align=right | 3.2 km || 
|-id=998 bgcolor=#E9E9E9
| 126998 ||  || — || March 21, 2002 || Anderson Mesa || LONEOS || — || align=right | 5.4 km || 
|-id=999 bgcolor=#E9E9E9
| 126999 ||  || — || March 22, 2002 || Palomar || NEAT || — || align=right | 3.4 km || 
|-id=000 bgcolor=#E9E9E9
| 127000 ||  || — || March 22, 2002 || Palomar || NEAT || — || align=right | 2.6 km || 
|}

References

External links 
 Discovery Circumstances: Numbered Minor Planets (125001)–(130000) (IAU Minor Planet Center)

0126